= Man or boy test =

Computer algorithm for evaluating compiler implementations

The man or boy test was proposed by computer scientist Donald Knuth as a means of evaluating implementations of the ALGOL 60 programming language. The aim of the test was to distinguish compilers that correctly implemented "recursion and non-local references" from those that did not.

There are quite a few ALGOL60 translators in existence which have been designed to handle recursion and non-local references properly, and I thought perhaps a little test-program may be of value. Hence I have written the following simple routine, which may separate the man-compilers from the boy-compilers.

— Donald Knuth

== Knuth's example ==
In ALGOL 60:

begin
  real procedure A(k, x1, x2, x3, x4, x5);
  value k; integer k;
  real x1, x2, x3, x4, x5;
  begin
    real procedure B;
    begin k := k - 1;
          B := A := A(k, B, x1, x2, x3, x4)
    end;
    if k ≤ 0 then A := x4 + x5 else B
  end;
  outreal(1, A(10, 1, -1, -1, 1, 0))
end

This creates a tree of B call frames that refer to each other and to the containing A call frames, each of which has its own copy of k that changes every time the associated B is called. Trying to work it through on paper is probably fruitless, but for k = 10, the correct answer is −67, despite the fact that in the original article Knuth conjectured it to be −121. Even modern machines quickly run out of stack space for larger values of k, which are tabulated below (OEIS: A132343).

k	$A(k, 1, -1, -1, 1, 0)$
0	1
1	0
2	−2
3	0
4	1
5	0
6	1
7	−1
8	−10
9	−30
10	−67
11	−138
12	−291
13	−642
14	−1446
15	−3250
16	−7244
17	−16065
18	−35601
19	−78985
20	−175416
21	−389695
22	−865609
23	−1922362
24	−4268854
25	−9479595
26	−21051458

== Explanation ==
There are three Algol features used in this program that can be difficult to implement properly in a compiler:

1. Nested function definitions: Since B is being defined in the local context of A, the body of B has access to symbols that are local to A — most notably k, which it modifies, but also x1, x2, x3, x4, and x5. This is straightforward in the Algol descendant Pascal, but not possible in the other major Algol descendant C (without manually simulating the mechanism by using C's address-of operator, passing around pointers to local variables between the functions).
2. Function references: The B in the recursive call A(k, B, x1, x2, x3, x4) is not a call to B, but a reference to B, which will be called only when k is greater than zero. This is straightforward in standard Pascal (ISO 7185), and also in C. Some variants of Pascal (e.g. older versions of Turbo Pascal) do not support procedure references, but when the set of functions that may be referenced is known beforehand (in this program it is only B), this can be worked around.
3. Constant/function dualism: The x1 through x5 parameters of A may be numeric constants or references to the function B — the x4 + x5 expression must be prepared to handle both cases as if the formal parameters x4 and x5 had been replaced by the corresponding actual parameter (call by name). This is probably more of a problem in statically typed languages than in dynamically typed languages, but the standard workaround is to reinterpret the constants 1, 0, and −1 in the main call to A as functions without arguments that return these values.

These things are, however, not what the test is about; they are merely prerequisites for the test to at all be meaningful. What the test is about is whether the different references to B resolve to the correct instance of B — one that has access to the same A-local symbols as the B that created the reference. A "boy" compiler might, for example, instead compile the program so that B always accesses the topmost A call frame.

== See also ==
- Funarg problem
- Jensen's device
