= Function value =

Function value may refer to:

- In mathematics, the value of a function when applied to an argument.
- In computer science, a closure.
