= First-class citizen =

Concept in programming language design

In a given programming language design, a first-class citizen (Note: Also known as first-class type, first-class entity, first-class object, or first-class value.) is an entity which supports all the operations generally available to other entities. These operations typically include being passed as an argument, returned from a function, and assigned to a variable.

== History ==
The concept of first- and second-class objects was introduced by Christopher Strachey in the 1960s. He did not actually define the term strictly, but contrasted real numbers and procedures in ALGOL:

First and second class objects. In ALGOL, a real number may appear in an expression or be assigned to a variable, and either of them may appear as an actual parameter in a procedure call. A procedure, on the other hand, may only appear in another procedure call either as the operator (the most common case) or as one of the actual parameters. There are no other expressions involving procedures or whose results are procedures. Thus in a sense procedures in ALGOL are second class citizens—they always have to appear in person and can never be represented by a variable or expression (except in the case of a formal parameter)...

Robin Popplestone gave the following definition: All items have certain fundamental rights.

1. All items can be the actual parameters of functions
2. All items can be returned as results of functions
3. All items can be the subject of assignment statements
4. All items can be tested for equality.

During the 1990s, Raphael Finkel proposed definitions of second and third class values, but these definitions have not been widely adopted.

== Examples ==
The simplest scalar data types, such as integer and floating-point numbers, are nearly always first-class.

In many older languages, arrays and strings are not first-class: they cannot be assigned as objects or passed as parameters to a subroutine. For example, neither Fortran IV nor C supports array assignment, and when they are passed as parameters, only the position of their first element is actually passed—their size is lost. C appears to support assignment of array pointers, but in fact these are simply pointers to the array's first element, and again do not carry the array's size.

In most languages, data types are not first-class objects, though in some object-oriented languages, classes are first-class objects and are instances of metaclasses. Languages in the functional programming family often also feature first-class types, in the form of, for example, generalized algebraic data types, or other metalanguage amenities enabling programs to implement extensions to their own implementation language.

Few languages support continuations and GOTO-labels as objects at all, let alone as first-class objects.

Concept	Description	Languages
first-class function	closures and anonymous functions	Smalltalk, Dart, Scheme, ML, Haskell, F#, Kotlin, Scala, Swift, Perl, PHP, Python, Raku, JavaScript, Delphi, Rust, Common Lisp, C#
first-class control	continuations	Scheme, ML, F#
first-class type	dependent types	Rocq, Idris, Agda
first-class data type		Generic Haskell, C++
first-class polymorphism	impredicative polymorphism	
first-class message	dynamic messages (method calls)	Smalltalk, Objective-C, Common Lisp
first-class class	metaclass and metaobject	Smalltalk, Objective-C, Ruby, Python, Delphi, Common Lisp
first-class proofs	proof object	Rocq, Agda

== Functions ==
Many programming languages support passing and returning function values, which can be applied to arguments. Whether this suffices to call function values first-class is disputed.

Some authors require it be possible to create new functions at runtime to call them 'first-class'. Under this definition, functions in C are not first-class objects; instead, they are sometimes called second-class objects, because they can still be manipulated in most of the above fashions (via function pointers).

In Smalltalk, functions (methods) are first-class objects, just like Smalltalk classes. Since Smalltalk operators (+, -, etc.) are methods, they are also first-class objects.

== Reflection ==
Some languages, such as Java and PHP, have an explicit reflection subsystem which allow access to internal implementation structures even though they are not accessible or manipulable in the same way as ordinary objects.

In other languages, such as those in the Lisp family, reflection is a central feature of the language, rather than a special subsystem. Typically this takes the form of some set of the following features:

- syntactic macros or fexprs – which allow the user to write code which handles code as data and evaluates it by discretion, enabling, for example, programs to write programs (or rewrite themselves) inside of the compiler, interpreter, or even the parser (reader macros);
- a meta-circular evaluator – which provides a definition of the language's evaluator as a compiled tautologisation of itself, facilitating straightforward modification of the language without requiring a metalanguage different from itself;
- a metaobject protocol – a special form of meta-circular evaluator for object-oriented programming, in which the object system implements itself recursively via a system of metaclasses and metaobjects, which are themselves classes and objects.

These allow varying forms of first-class access to the language implementation, and are, in general, manipulable in the same way as, and fully indistinguishable from, ordinary language objects. Because of this, their usage generally comes with some (cultural) stipulations and advice, as untested modification of the core programming system by users can easily undermine performance optimisations made by language implementers.

== See also ==
- First-class function
- Reification
