= Bash =

Bash or BASH may refer to:

== Arts and entertainment ==
- Bash! (Rockapella album), 1992
- Bash! (Dave Bailey album), 1961
- Bash: Latter-Day Plays, a dramatic triptych
- BASH! (role-playing game), a 2005 superhero game
- "Bash" (Glee), an episode from the fifth season of the Glee television show
- WWE The Bash, a professional wrestling event
- Buenos Aires in the Southern Highlands, a social Tango dance event in Australia
- Bash, a playable character in the Skylanders video game franchise
- Bash and Dash, two logging engines in the television series Thomas & Friends
- BASH, the tech company led by CEO Peter Isherwell in the 2021 film Don't Look Up

== Other uses ==
- Bash (name), including a list of persons with the name
- Bash (Unix shell), computer software and language
- The Bash (company), an event services booking platform, formerly known as GigMasters
- Party, a social gathering
- Strike (attack), a physical assault
- Bird aircraft strike hazard, an aircraft and bird collision
- British Association for the Study of Headache, a member of the Migraine Trust

== See also ==
- Bash Brothers (disambiguation)
- Bashing (disambiguation)
- Bashful (disambiguation)
