= C standard =

C standard may refer to:

- ANSI C, C99, C11, C17, or C23, specifications of the C programming language
- C standard library
- C tuning (guitar), a type of tuning for guitars
