= Outline of the C programming language =

Programming language

The following outline is provided as an overview of and topical guide to C:

C is a general-purpose, procedural, compiled, and statically typed programming language. It was created by Dennis Ritchie in 1972 at Bell Labs as a successor to the B language.

== What type of language is C? ==
C can be described as all of the following:

- Programming language — artificial language designed to communicate instructions to a machine, particularly a computer.
- Compiled language — language implemented through compilers rather than interpreters
- Procedural programming language — programming paradigm based on the concept of procedure calls
- General-purpose programming language — designed for writing software in a wide variety of application domains
- Statically typed programming language — type checking is performed at compile-time

== History of C ==
- B programming language — precursor to C
- K&R C — early version described by Kernighan and Ritchie
- ANSI C / ISO C standards:
  - C89/C90
  - C99
  - C11
  - C17
  - C23 — current standard

== General C concepts ==
- Callback
- Control flow
- Pointers
- Dynamic memory allocation
- Data types
- Enumeration
- File input/output
- Functions
- Header files
- Memory management
- Operators
- Preprocessor directives
- Recursion
- Standard streams
- Static variables
- String handling
- Structs
- Type conversion
- Undefined behavior
- Unions
- Variables

== Issues / Limitations ==
- Constructs that behave differently in C and C++
- Cyber security
- Undefined behavior

== C Toolchain ==
=== C compilers ===
- GCC — GNU Compiler Collection
- Clang — LLVM C compiler
- MSVC — Microsoft Visual C++ compiler (supports C)
- TinyCC
- Turbo C

=== C libraries ===
==== C Standard Library ====
The C standard library provides fundamental routines for:

- Input/output (stdio.h)
- String handling (string.h)
- Mathematical computations (math.h)
- Memory management (stdlib.h)
- Time and date (time.h)

==== Other notable libraries ====
- GLib
- SDL
- GSL
- libcurl
- OpenSSL

== Notable projects written in C ==
- CPython — the reference implementation of the Python programming language
- Git — version control system
- The Linux kernel
- Bash, Coreutils, Autoconf and other command line utilities
- Lua, PHP, Perl — Scripting languages
- PostgreSQL — relational database systems
- Redis — in-memory database
- SQLite — embedded SQL database engine
- Unix — originally rewritten in C at Bell Labs
- Vim
- GNOME, MATE and Xfce — desktop environments
- X window system and Wayland — windowing systems
- Apache HTTP Server and nginx — Web servers
- cURL — command line web client and library
- HAProxy — multiprotocol load balancer and reverse proxy
- OpenSSH
- OpenSSL
- OpenLDAP

== Example source code ==
- Articles with example C code

== C publications ==
=== Books about C ===
- Andrew Koenig – C Traps and Pitfalls
- Brian W. Kernighan – The C Programming Language
- Guy L. Steele Jr. – C: A Reference Manual
- Herbert Schildt – C, The Complete Reference
- Peter van der Linden – Expert C Programming: Deep C Secrets

=== Magazines about C ===
- C/C++ Users Journal — (historical publication)

== C programmers ==
- John Carmack – game programmer, known for Doom and Quake.
- Brian Kernighan — wrote The C Programming Language book
- Rob Pike – worked on Unix and Plan 9, contributed to C and its ecosystem.
- Dennis Ritchie — created the C programming language
- Richard Stallman – founder of the GNU Project
- Tim Sweeney – founder of Epic Games and creator of Unreal Engine
- Ken Thompson — Unix
- Linus Torvalds — Linux

== C dialects ==
- Cyclone — safe variant
- Embedded C
- GNU C — features specific to GCC
- K&R C
- Microsoft C — Microsoft-specific extensions
- Objective-C — object-oriented extension of C

== C learning resources ==
- Codecademy – interactive C programming lessons
- GeeksforGeeks – tutorials, coding examples, and interactive programming for C concepts and data structures
- Learn-C.org – free interactive C tutorial for beginners
- CProgramming.com Tutorial – tutorials, examples, and best practices for learning C
- W3Schools – beginner-friendly C tutorials
- Wikibooks C Programming – free open-content textbook

=== Competitive programming ===
- Codeforces – an online platform for programming contests that supports C submissions
- Codewars – gamified coding challenges
- HackerRank – competitive programming and interview preparation site with C challenges
- LeetCode – online judge and problem-solving platform

== See also ==
- Compatibility of C and C++
- List of software programming journals
- List of C-family programming languages
- Outline of computer programming
- Outline of software
- Outline of software engineering

=== Outlines of other programming languages ===
- Outline of the C sharp programming language
- Outline of the C++ programming language
- Outline of the Java programming language
- Outline of the JavaScript programming language
- Outline of the Perl programming language
- Outline of the Python programming language
- Outline of the Rust programming language
