= C29 (C standard revision) =

C programming language standard draft planned for release in 2029

C29 is the upcoming revision of the C programming language after C23 that is planned for release in late 2029, informally named C2Y. Early working drafts of C29 were released after the January 2024 WG14 meeting. The current working draft N3998 was released in October 2026. Changes have already started to be integrated in popular C/C++ compilers: GCC 15 and Clang 19.

GCC supports and defaults to C23 support, and while no other compiler support, others have strong partial support, except for MSVC that has incomplete minimal support for it.

== Features ==
The following are changes integrated into the latest working draft of C29. The following changes are still is the draft stage, thus anything may change before the final ratification.

Note: This section is not complete. Changes listed in the History section will be incrementally migrated into this section over time.

=== Constants ===
- Add 0o and 0O octal prefix for literal constants; such as 0o137 and 0O247. This change is similar to the 0b and 0B binary prefixes that were previously added in the C23 & C++14 standards, and earlier established 0x and 0X hexadecimal prefixes.
- Add {} delimited escape sequences for C strings: \o{} for octal (arbitrary number of octal digits), \x{} for hexadecimal (arbitrary number of hex digits), \u{} for universal character name (sequence of hex digits that represents a valid Unicode character); such as "\o{110}\x{65}llo" which creates a string identical to "Hello" (in ASCII), and "\u{2021}" which is the Unicode value of a double dagger "‡" character, creating that character. This change was previously added in the C++23 standard. The \u{} format is an established syntax in Rust and JavaScript computer languages.

=== Operators ===
- Add _Countof keyword & operator, and countof macro in the new <stdcountof.h> header of the C standard library to determine the number of elements of an array, such as long baudrate[22]; size_t n = countof(baudrate); means n is 22. This is already possible in C++ using the std::size() function.
- For the array subscript operator, add the ability to subscript register arrays without undefined/implementation defined behavior. If a is an array and i has integer type a[i] is redefined to mean the i + 1-th element of the array instead of *(a + i), avoiding the array-to-pointer conversion which is undefined for register arrays in C23 and is implementation-defined after N3244. In addition, if i is a constant expression, then it is not allowed to be negative, which removes one possible cause of undefined behavior.

=== Statements ===
- For the if statement, add support for variable declaration, such as if (int err = xmit_ch('X')) log_err(err);, similar to how the for change was added in the C99 standard. The new variable can be used inside the scope of both the if and the else branch. In C++, variable declaration has been allowed since the C++98 standard, further enhanced in the C++17 standard to allow for a second clause so the variable could be used within the condition itself, and C will use the latter for C++ compatibility.
- For the switch statement, add support for case ranges by placing ... (ellipsis) between two integer constants, such as case 1 ... 3: which would be equivalent to case 1: case 2: case 3:. The space between the numbers and the ellipsis is mandatory.
- For statements that are iterations and for the switch statement, add naming via labels and transferring control through named break label; and continue label; (multi-level breaks). The syntax is the same as in Java.

=== Preprocessor ===
- Add __COUNTER__ macro. Each time used, the preprocessor expands it into a unique sequential integer literal, starting from 0 and increments by 1 every time it is expanded. Though already in use by many compilers, this change makes it an official standardized macro for C.

=== Standard Library ===
==== Existing functions ====
- For functions strtol(), strtoll(), strtoul(), strtoull(), and their wide counterparts wcstol(), wcstoll(), wcstoul(), wcstoull(), if the value of base is 8 (octal), the characters 0o or 0O may optionally precede the sequence of digits. If a sign is present, the 0o or 0O follows the sign.
- For functions strnlen_s() and wcsnlen_s(), their description was updated to be worded similar to the new strnlen() and wcsnlen() functions (below).

==== New functions ====
- Add strnlen() and wcsnlen() functions, similar to strlen() but instead a specified maximum number of characters will be searched for the end of string character. Both functions have been part of the GNU C library since at least 2001 and later became part of the POSIX.1-2008 standard.
- Add bit utility functions / macros / types in header <stdbit.h> to examine many integer types. All start with stdc_ to minimize conflict with legacy code and 3rd party libraries. More bit utility functions were previously added in the C23 standard.
  - Add stdc_memreverse8() (8-bit) and stdc_memreverse8uN() (exact-width 8-bit) to reverse memory, such as 0xAABBCCDDu reversed into 0xDDCCBBAAu. For function name suffix: "u" means unsigned, "N" means a multiple of 8, such as 8, 16, 32, ...
  - Add stdc_rotate_left_uc(), stdc_rotate_left_us(), stdc_rotate_left_ui(), stdc_rotate_left_ul(), stdc_rotate_left_ull(), and generic stdc_rotate_left() to rotate bits left.
  - Add stdc_rotate_right_uc(), stdc_rotate_right_us(), stdc_rotate_right_ui(), stdc_rotate_right_ul(), stdc_rotate_right_ull(), and generic stdc_rotate_right() to rotate bits right.
  - Add stdc_load8_leuN(), stdc_load8_beuN(), stdc_load8_aligned_leuN(), stdc_load8_aligned_beuN(), and stdc_load8_lesN(), stdc_load8_besN(), stdc_load8_aligned_lesN(), stdc_load8_aligned_besN() to perform endian-aware 8-bit loads. For function name suffix: "b" means big endian, "l" means little endian, "u" means unsigned, "s" means signed, "N" means a multiple of 8 such as 8, 16, 32, ...
  - Add stdc_store8_leuN(), stdc_store8_beuN(), stdc_store8_aligned_leuN(), stdc_store8_aligned_beuN(), and stdc_store8_lesN(), stdc_store8_besN(), stdc_store8_aligned_lesN(), stdc_store8_aligned_besN() to perform endian-aware 8-bit stores. For function name suffix: "b" means big endian, "l" means little endian, "u" means unsigned, "s" means signed, "N" means a multiple of 8 such as 8, 16, 32, ...
- Add text transcoding utilities under the header <stdmchar.h>.

== Obsolete features ==
Obsolete C programming language features removed or deprecated in the working draft of C29:

=== Constants ===
- For octal literals, such as 057, the leading zero will be marked as obsolescent but retained to avoid breaking existing code. Compilers should output a warning that will hopefully encourage rewrites. As of N3353, there will be no changes to printf(), but WG14 would like to see a future paper that propose changes.

=== Keywords ===
- Remove _Imaginary from the list of keywords.

=== Operators ===
- For the array subscripting operator, the form i[a], where i has integer type is marked obsolescent but remains supported.

== Compiler support ==
The following compilers implement an experimental compiler flag to support C29:

- GNU GCC 15.
- LLVM Clang 19.
- SDCC 4.6.0

== History ==
The highlighted changes in this section have been summarized in the feature sections above.

=== January 2024 ===
The following changes were made after the January 2024 WG14 meeting:

- N3192 - "Sequential hexdigits".
- Editorial - Adjusted a footnote in Annex K from "reserved" to "potentially reserved".

=== June 2024 ===
The following changes were made after the June 2024 WG14 meeting:

- N3064 - "Writing to multibyte character files".
- N3232 - "Round-trip rounding".
- N3233 - "Recommendation for printf rounding".
- N3239 - "Some constants are literally literals, v2".
- N3242 - "Problematic use of "correctly rounded".
- N3244 - "Slay Some Earthly Demons I".
- N3247 - "fopen "p" and bring fopen’s mode closer to POSIX 202x".
- N3254 - "Accessing byte arrays, v4".
- N3259 - "Support ++ and -- on complex values".
- N3260 - "_Generic selection expression with a type operand".
- N3273 - "alignof of an incomplete array type".
- N3274 - "Remove imaginary types, v3".
- Editorial - "may" -> "can" for alignment with ISO/IEC directives.
- Editorial - Table headings changed to match ISO/IEC directives.

=== September 2024 ===
The following changes were made after the September/October 2024 WG14 meeting:

- N3272 - "strftime broken-down structure usage (Option 1 - "Undefined Behavior)".
- N3286 - "Floating-point exception for Macro Replacements".
- N3287 - "Nonsensical Parenthetical in Mathematics Specification".
- N3291 - "Decimal Floating-Point Number Term Misuse".
- N3298 - "Introduce Complex Literals".
- N3303 - "HUGE_VAL Corrections".
- N3305 - "Leftover WANT_... Macros for <math.h> and Decimal Floating-Point".
- N3312 - "Relax Atomic Alignment Requirements".
- N3322 - "Allow Zero Length operations on Null Pointers (Including in the Library)".
- N3323 - "How Do You Add One To Something? (By Using The Proper Type)".
- N3324 - "'pole-error' Wording Fix".
- N3326 - "Standardize strnlen and wcsnlen".
- N3340 - "Slay Some Earthly Demons II".
- N3341 - "Slay Some Earthly Demons III".
- N3342 - "Slay Some Earthly Demons IV".
- N3344 - "Slay Some Earthly Demons VI".
- N3345 - "Slay Some Earthly Demons VII".
- N3346 - "Slay Some Earthly Demons VIII".
- N3349 - "abs Without Undefined Behavior".
- N3353 - "Obsolete Octal and Provide New, Proper Escape Sequences".
- N3355 - "Named/Labeled Loops".
- N3356 - "if Declarations".
- N3364 - "SNAN Initialization".
- N3366 - "Restartable Functions for Efficient Character Conversions".
- N3367 - "More Modern Bit Utilities".
- N3369 - "The _Lengthof Operator".
- N3370 - "Case Ranges in switch Statements".
- N3461 - "range error definition followup".

=== February 2025 ===
The following changes were made after the February 2025 WG14 meeting:

- N3363 - "<stdarg.h> Wording".
- N3401 - "SIGFPE and I/O (v2)".
- N3405 - "Improved Wording for Treatment of Error Conditions in <math.h>".
- N3409 - "Slay Some Earthly Demons X".
- N3410 - "Slay Some Earthly Demons XI".
- N3411 - "Slay Some Earthly Demons XII".
- N3418 - "Slay Some Earthly Demons XIV".
- N3447 - "Chasing Ghost I - "Constant Expressions".
- N3448 - "Chasing Ghosts II - "Accessing Allocated Storage".
- N3451 - "Initialization of Anonymous Structures and Unions (v2)".
- N3452 - "Complex Literals Warning".
- N3459 - "Integer and Arithmetic Constant Expressions".
- N3460 - "Complex Operators".
- N3466 - "Clarifications on Null Pointers in the Library".
- N3469 - "Big Array Size Survey (_Lengthof -> _Countof, and <stdcountof.h> header)".
- N3478 - "Slay Some Earthly Demons XIII".
- N3481 - "Slay Some Earthly Demons XVI".
- N3482 - "Slay Some Earthly Demons XVII".
- N3492 - "Improved treatment of error conditions for functions that round result".
- N3496 - "Clarify the Specification of the Width Macros".
- N3505 - "Preprocessor integer expressions, II".

=== August 2025 ===
The following changes were made after the August 2025 WG14 meeting:

- N3348 - "Matching of Multi-Dimensional Arrays in Generic Selection Expressions".
- N3457 - "The __COUNTER__ predefined macro".
- N3484 - "Slay Some Earthly Demons V".
- N3500 - "Clarification for Complex Suffix Specification".
- N3511 - "Remove "category" from "type category" in footnote".
- N3517 - "Array subscripting without decay".
- N3525 - "static_assert without UB".
- N3532 - "Member Access of an Incomplete struct Should Not Be Allowed".
- N3535 - "frexp and double-double".
- N3536 - "Clarify wording of cproj".
- N3537 - "Correct and clarify 7.3.1 Introduction of Complex Arithmetic <complex.h>".
- N3544 - "Classification of the register Storage-class Specifier".
- N3558 - "Chasing Ghosts I - "Constant Expressions and Objects of Known Constant Size"".
- N3563 - "Representation of Pointers and nullptr_t".
- N3577 - "Rename uimaxabs to umaxabs".
- N3598 - "Make text consistent between creal and cimag".
- N3623 - "Slay Some Earthly Demons XIV - "Definition of Main".
- N3652 - "Composite types v1.3".

=== February 2026 ===
The following changes were integrated at or before the 2026 February Virtual meeting:

- N3715 - "static_assert expressions, v2.2 (November 2025 integration from between-meeting strawpolls, approved August 2025)".

== Ongoing proposals ==
A "defer" mechanism has been proposed for C29, with the defer keyword and statements. This is similar to Go or Zig which both use defer for cleanup. Compilers like GCC and Clang have implemented this specification.

== See also ==
- C++26, C++29
- Compatibility of C and C++
- Outline of the C programming language

| Preceded by C23 | C language standards | Latest |
