= LCC (compiler) =

C compiler

- Developers: Dave Hanson and Chris Fraser
- Release: 1994; 32 years ago
- Stable release: 4.2 / September 4, 2002; 24 years ago
- Written in: C
- Operating system: Cross-platform
- Type: Compiler
- License: LCC License
- Website: drh.github.io/lcc/
- Repository: github.com/drh/lcc

LCC ("Local C Compiler" or "Little C Compiler") is a small, retargetable compiler for the ANSI C programming language. Although its source code is available at no charge for personal use, it is not open-source or free software according to the usual definitions because products derived from LCC may not be sold, although components not derived from LCC may be sold. It was developed by Chris Fraser and David Hanson.

== LCC ==
LCC is intended to be very simple to understand and is well-documented; its design is described in Fraser and Hanson's book A Retargetable C Compiler: Design and Implementation. The book includes most of the source code for version 3.6 of the compiler, which was written as a literate program using noweb. As of July 2011 the current version of LCC is 4.2, but much of the book still applies to this version. The major change since the book was published is in the code-generator interface, which is described in a separate document.

The source code for LCC is around 20,000 lines, which is much smaller than many major compilers.

LCC can generate code for several processor architectures, including Alpha, SPARC, MIPS, and x86; there is also an LCC backend that generates Microsoft's Common Intermediate Language.

== Projects incorporating LCC ==
=== Quake 3 ===
id Software's id Tech 3 engine relies on a modified version of LCC to compile the source code of each game module or third-party mod into bytecode targeting its virtual machine. This means that modules are oblivious to the system beyond the limited functionality made available by the engine, which is intended to reduce the threat posed by malicious mod authors. Another consideration is that games and mods written for the engine are portable without recompilation; only the virtual machine needs to be ported to new platforms in order to execute the modules.

=== lcc-win ===
lcc-win32 is an integrated development environment package for Microsoft Windows which includes a fork of LCC. An amd64 counterpart named lcc-win64 exists, which has been available since April 15, 2012.

=== Pelles C ===
Pelles C is a heavily modified version of LCC providing C11 as well as C17 and C23 support, amd64 support, additional optimisation techniques such as inline expansion and an IDE.

=== MathWorks ===
For Windows machines, Lcc was used as a default if no other compiler was installed for MathWorks MATLAB and related products up to version R2023b.

== License ==
LCC is free for personal use and may be redistributed provided all distribution media and product documentation acknowledges it. The LCC license relies on examples in multiple cases. LCC may not be sold for profit, but it may be included with other software that is sold for profit, provided LCC itself is distributed for free. Per user and unlimited use licenses are available by contacting Addison-Wesley, in particular for compilers of languages such as C++ for which a C compiler may constitute much of its work.

== See also ==
- Tiny C Compiler
- Portable C compiler
- Small-C
- Comparison of integrated development environments

== Bibliography ==
- Fraser, Christopher W.; Hanson, David R. (1995). A Retargetable C Compiler: Design and Implementation. Addison-Wesley. ISBN 0-8053-1670-1.
