= David Hanson (computer scientist) =

Computer scientist

David R. Hanson is a software engineer who worked at Google in programming languages, compilers, software tools, and programming environments, until he retired in January 2012.

== Biography ==
Before joining Google, he was with Microsoft Research, Princeton, University of Arizona, and Yale. He has written many journal and conference papers and two books: A Retargetable C Compiler: Design and Implementation with Christopher Fraser, which describes lcc, a widely used compiler for Standard C, and C Interfaces and Implementations: Techniques for Creating Reusable Software.

Hanson is largely responsible for designing and implementing the "View as Slideshow" feature for PowerPoint and attachments in Google's Gmail system.

Hanson enjoys skiing and cycling. He also builds furniture.
