= C17 (C standard revision) =

C programming language standard, 2017 revision

C17, formally ISO/IEC 9899:2018, is an open standard for the C programming language, prepared in 2017 and published on 5 July 2018. It replaced C11 (standard ISO/IEC 9899:2011), and is superseded by C23 (ISO/IEC 9899:2024) since October 2024. Since it was under development in 2017, and officially published in 2018, C17 is sometimes referred to as C18.

== Changes from C11 ==
C17 fixes numerous minor defects in C11 without introducing new language features.

The __STDC_VERSION__ macro is increased to the value 201710L.

For a detailed list of changes from the previous standard, see Clarification Request Summary for C11. Examples of changes include fixes for #elif, realloc(), and typos, among others.

== Compiler support ==
List of compilers supporting C17:

- GCC 8.1.0
- LLVM Clang 7.0.0
- IAR EWARM v8.40.1
- Microsoft Visual C++ VS 2019 (16.8)
- Pelles C 9.00

== See also ==
- C++17
- Compatibility of C and C++
- Outline of the C programming language

Preceded by C11	C language standards	Succeeded by C23
