= Bash (name) =

Bash is a surname.

== Persons ==
- Baby Bash (born 1975), a Latin American hip-hop artist
- Dana Bash (born 1971), CNN reporter and anchorwoman
- Frankie Bash (born 1993), American musician
- Jeremy Bash (born 1971), Chief of Staff to the United States Secretary of Defense
- John Bash, American attorney
- Mohamad Bash (born 1982), Syrian musician
- Todd Bash (born 1965), American playwright
- Zina Bash, American attorney

== Also ==
- Peter Bash, titular character in the American TV series Franklin & Bash
- Bash, nickname of E. J. H. Nash (1898–1982), an influential evangelical clergyman
- Bash, one of the Logging Loco's from Thomas & Friends
