= Bash Brothers (disambiguation) =

The Bash Brothers are a pair of former baseball players.

Bash Brothers may also refer to:

- Nickname for Fulton Reed and Dean Portman in The Mighty Ducks (film series)
- The Bash Brothers DJ Crew co-founded by DJ Concept
- The Unauthorized Bash Brothers Experience, a musical comedy special by The Lonely Island
