= C++17 =

2017 edition of the C++ programming language standard

C++17 is a version of the ISO/IEC 14882 standard for the C++ programming language. C++17 replaced the prior version of the C++ standard, called C++14, and was later replaced by C++20.

== History ==
Before the C++ Standards Committee fixed a 3-year release cycle, C++17's release date was uncertain. In that time period, the C++17 revision was also called C++1z, following C++0x or C++1x for C++11 and C++1y for C++14. The C++17 specification reached the Draft International Standard (DIS) stage in March 2017. This DIS was unanimously approved, with only editorial comments, and the final standard was published as ISO/IEC 14882:2017 in December 2017. Few changes were made to the C++ Standard Template Library, although some algorithms in the <algorithm> header were given support for explicit parallelization and some syntactic enhancements were made.

== New features ==
C++17 introduced many new features. The following lists may be incomplete.

=== Language ===
- Making the text message for static_assert optional
- Allow typename (as an alternative to class) in a template template parameter
- New rules for auto deduction from braced-init-list
- Nested namespace definitions, e.g., namespace X::Y { ... } instead of namespace X { namespace Y { ... } }
- Allowing attributes for namespaces and enumerators
- New standard attributes [[fallthrough]], [[maybe_unused]] and [[nodiscard]]
- UTF-8 (u8) character literals (UTF-8 string literals have existed since C++11; C++17 adds the corresponding character literals for consistency, though as they are restricted to a single byte they can only store "Basic Latin" and C0 control codes, i.e. ASCII)
- Hexadecimal floating-point literals
- Use of auto as the type for a non-type template parameter
- Constant evaluation for all non-type template arguments
- Fold expressions, for variadic templates
- A compile-time static if with the form if constexpr (expression)
- Structured binding declarations, allowing auto [a, b] = getTwoReturnValues();
- Initializers in if and switch statements
- copy-initialization and direct-initialization of objects of type T from prvalue expressions of type T (ignoring top-level cv-qualifiers) shall result in no copy or move constructors from the prvalue expression. See copy elision for more information.
- Some extensions on over-aligned memory allocation
- Class template argument deduction (CTAD), introducing constructor deduction guides, e.g. allowing std::pair(5.0, false) instead of requiring explicit constructor arguments types std::pair<double, bool>(5.0, false) or an additional helper template function std::make_pair(5.0, false).
- Inline variables, which allows the definition of variables in header files without violating the one definition rule. The rules are effectively the same as inline functions
- __has_include, allowing the availability of a header to be checked by preprocessor directives
- Value of __cplusplus changed to 201703L
- Exception specifications were made part of the function type
- Lambda expressions can capture *this by value

=== Library ===
- Most of Library Fundamentals TS I, including:
  - <string_view> header: std::string_view, a read-only non-owning reference to a character sequence or string-slice
  - <optional>: std::optional, for representing optional objects, a data type that may not always be returned by a given algorithm with support for non-return
  - <any>: std::any, for representing the any type, which holds a single value of any type
- std::uncaught_exceptions, as a replacement of std::uncaught_exception in exception handling. Located in <exception>. uncaught_exceptions counts the number of exceptions in the current thread that have been thrown/rethrown and not yet entered a matching catch clause, whereas uncaught_exception only detects whether stack unwinding is in progress.
- New insertion functions try_emplace and insert_or_assign for std::map (a tree map) and std::unordered_map (a hash map) key-value associative data structures
- Uniform container access: std::size, std::empty and std::data
- Definition of "contiguous iterators"
- <filesystem>: a file system library, std::filesystem (based on boost::filesystem)
- Parallel versions of STL algorithms
- <cmath>: additional mathematical special functions, including elliptic integrals and Bessel functions
- <variant>: std::variant, a tagged union container
- A std::byte enum, allowing char to be replaced for data types intending to model a byte of data as a byte rather than a character. Note that this is not a primitive type, does not support direct arithmetic, and is not related to Java/C#'s byte primitive.
- Logical operator traits: std::conjunction, std::disjunction and std::negation
- <memory_resource> header, for polymorphic memory resources

== Removed features ==
This revision of C++ not only added new features but also removed a few.

- Trigraphs were removed.
- Some deprecated types and functions were removed from the standard library, including std::auto_ptr, std::random_shuffle, and old function adaptors. These were superseded in C++11 by improved facilities such as std::unique_ptr, std::shuffle, std::bind, and lambdas.
- The (formerly deprecated) use of the keyword register as a storage class specifier was removed. This keyword is still reserved but now unused.

== Compiler support ==
- GCC has had complete support for C++17 language features since version 8.
- Clang 5 and later supports all C++17 language features.
- Visual Studio 2017 15.8 (MSVC 19.15) and later supports all C++17 language features.

== Library support ==
- libstdc++ since version 9.1 has complete support for C++17 (8.1 without Parallelism TS and referring to C99 instead of C11)
- libc++ as of version 9 has partial support for C++17, with the remainder "in progress"
- Visual Studio 2017 15.8 (MSVC 19.15) Standard Library and later supports all C++17 library features except for "Elementary String Conversions" and referring to C99 instead of C11. "Elementary String Conversions" is added in Visual Studio 2019 16.4

== See also ==
- C17 (C standard revision)
- C++ compilers
