= Todd Bash =

American dramatist

Todd Bash (born 1965) is an avant-garde playwright from Los Angeles, California.

He has written more than twenty works for the theatre, many performed and published, as well as prose, poetry and film projects. He is also the creator of numerous collages, art objects and musical experiments.

His early writing features a gritty, realistic style, and includes The Winning Number, Concrete and Blackouts.

By the late 1980s, Bash's approach changed radically, moving further and further into avant-garde territory. Often shattering the conventions of traditional theatre, and featuring dream-like imagery, his current style recalls the experiments of the Paris Surrealists during the 1920s. Among his plays from this period are Das Nachtgespenst, Goldring, Nachthunde and The Final Thoughts Of Stanislaw Bashkiewicz. His short opera libretto Seehunde was set to music by Japanese born composer Shigeru Kan-no.

Bash has worked with theatre companies in Los Angeles, New York and Philadelphia, as well as collaborations with artists from around the world. His writing has appeared in numerous periodicals, including Lost and Found Times, Neotrope and Gestalten, as well as collections published by Broken Boulder Press and Dog Ear Publishing. His book of plays Sanctus Fumigaci was published in 2007.
