= Bashful =

Bashful may refer to:

- Bashful (film), a 1917 American film
- Bashful (character), a character from Snow White and the Seven Dwarfs
- Bashful elephant, a stalagmite in Carlsbad Caverns, New Mexico, US
- Bashful Peak, a mountain in Alaska, US
- Boleslaus the Bashful (1226–1279), a Polish prince
- Bashful (Pac-Man), one of the ghosts in the arcade game Pac-Man (original name Kimagure (気まぐれ))
- A synonym for Shyness
