= Buenos Aires in the Southern Highlands =

Buenos Aires in the Southern Highlands (or short BASH) is a social Tango dance event held annually in November at Bundanoon, NSW, Australia. It is supported by Tango Social Club of Canberra and Tango Synergy of Sydney.

BASH was the originally thought up by Linda Macfarlane, Canberra and Karen Garnett, Sydney. Linda said that the tango crowd from Canberra wanted to dance with more people, and Karen from Sydney said the same about the Sydney scene. They both thought, why not bring the two crowds together? Figuring that a place geographically right in the middle would be ideal, Linda found Bundanoon as the perfect place. Thus BASH was born.

What started as a small idea for the Tango scenes of two cities to meet became an attractive dance event that grew to be well known national-wide and internationally: Tango dancers from Australia, New Zealand and come together for a weekend, usually in the second half of November to dance Tango to a variety of Tango music. BASH was first held in 2006. With this it is one of the longest running recurring festivals in Oceania, with up to 200 Tango dancers gathering for a weekend together and making the event an important icon of Australia's tango scene.
