= Register (keyword) =

Reserved word in C programming language

In the C programming language, register is a reserved word (or keyword), type modifier, storage class, and compiler hint to store a symbol in a CPU register.

== Info ==
register is a keyword in C, and formerly in C++. The register keyword was deprecated in C++, and later removed (but remains reserved) in C++17. It suggests that the compiler stores a declared variable in a CPU register (or some other faster location) instead of in random-access memory. If possible, depending on the type of CPU and the complexity of the program code, it will optimize access to that variable and hence improve the execution time of a program. In C (but not C++, where the keyword is essentially ignored), the location (address) of a variable declared with register cannot be accessed, but the sizeof operator can be applied. Aside from this limitation, register is essentially meaningless in modern compilers, due to optimization which will place variables in a register if appropriate, regardless of whether the hint is given.

For programming of embedded systems, register may still be significant; for example, the Microchip MPLAB XC32 compiler allows the programmer to specify a particular register with the keyword; however, this is discouraged in favor of the compiler's optimizations.

volatile unsigned int special;

unsigned int example() {
    register unsigned int my_reg asm("$4") = 32;
    my_reg += special;
    return my_reg;
}

When used, register is typically for loop counters, or possibly for other very frequently used variables in the code.

== Examples ==
// store integer variable "i" in RAM, register, or other location as compiler sees fit
int i = 0;

// suggests storing integer variable "i" in a CPU register or other fast location
register int i = 0;

== See also ==
- Optimizing compiler
- Program optimization
- Static (keyword)
