= BASH! (role-playing game) =

Superhero tabletop role-playing game

- 1st edition cover
- Designers: Chris Rutkowsky
- Publishers: Basic Action Games
- Genres: Superhero fiction

BASH! (Basic Action Super Heroes) is a superhero role-playing game published by Basic Action Games in 2005.

== Description ==
BASH! is a "rules light" system that uses simple dice rolls to cover a variety of situations.

=== Character Creation ===
Characters are created using a point system, but the gamemaster decides how many points are available and the proportions to be divided between Powers and Character Stats, based on the proposed campaign. As an example in the rulebook, for "mystery men in the pulp era" adventures, a total of 20 points is recommended, with 12 going to Stats and 8 to Powers. Stories about cosmic entities might involve 60 points or more, with over half going to Powers. Once the players know how many points they have, they can divide them between the character's three attributes (Brawn, Agility and Mind), and buy Powers from a list in the rulebook.

=== Gameplay ===
For both combat and skills resolutions, the player rolls two 6-sided dice and multiplies the result by the relevant Stat or Power. If the dice roll results in a double, the player rolls another die. If this is also the same number as the double, the player rolls a fourth die.

=== Advancement ===
Characters are awarded additional Character Points upon achievement of goals and completion of adventures.

== Publication history ==
BASH! is a 32-page book designed by Chris Rutkowsky and published by Basic Action Games in 2005. An expanded 132-page second edition titled BASH! Ultimate Edition was published in 2009 with artwork by Danilo Moretti and Thom Chiaramonte.

== Reception ==
Writing for OgreCave, Andy Vertomile reviewed the second edition and found the bright four-color graphic design "really appealing, with plenty of clean space, nice type, and fun artwork." But Vertomile found a large number of typos and errors "an absolute distraction." Vertolmile also found that character creation was not easy, and required a lot of "page flipping" from one rules section to another. Vertomile also found the overall organization of the rules was "slapdash." Vertomile concluded on an ambivalent note, saying, "BASH is good, it works and it does so on the levels the designers intended, but they should quit while they're ahead. The writers should heed their own advice: less is more ... It seems odd to chastise a book for its excesses, but for such an undemanding system the reader has a lot of work to do to make use of its virtues."

In Issue 12 of RPG Review, Dr. Samara reviewed the second edition and admitted to constantly tweaking the rules. "That must mean I really like it since I only play around with stuff I like (if I didn't like it, I wouldn't bother)." Samara found the biggest issue of the game was "the apparent lack of consistency. For me, game design should hew to the Hellenic concept of kallos; beautiful symmetry. I believe that a lot of the inconsistency in BASH! only needs a little work to fix; the kallos can be coaxed out without too much work. But it is there, all across the board." As a rules tinkerer, Samara found that "BASH! almost always does an excellent job of discussion what's going on under the hood and how you could change it."

The website Superhero RPGs called BASH! "an old school game for players who don’t want a bunch of clunky rules or setting information. If you hate games that introduces a concept with fiction, this is the game for you." The reviewer noted that although the second edition featured more rules, "you’re going to have a lot of gray areas for rules lawyers to exploit, so the second edition treads that fine line between moving away from the advantages of rules lite system and getting into the crunchy rulebooks. BASH! 2nd Edition is largely successful in walking that line."

== Awards ==
BASH! Ultimate Edition was a finalist for a 2010 ENnie award in the "Best Rules" category.
