= Bashing =

Bashing may refer:

- Bashing (pejorative), physical or verbal assault
- Bashing (film), a 2005 film by Kobayashi Masahiro
- Railfan jargon term for travelling behind certain locomotives
- An act of recreational radio-controlled car driving
