= C11 (C standard revision) =

C programming language standard, 2011 revision

C11 (previously C1X, formally ISO/IEC 9899:2011) is a past standard for the C programming language. It replaced C99 (standard ISO/IEC 9899:1999) and was superseded by C17 (standard ISO/IEC 9899:2018). C11 mainly standardizes features already supported by common contemporary compilers, and includes a detailed memory model to better support multiple threads of execution. Due to delayed availability of conforming C99 implementations, C11 makes certain features optional, to make it easier to comply with the core language standard.

The final draft, N1570, was published in April 2011. The new standard passed its final draft review on October 10, 2011 and was officially ratified by ISO and published as ISO/IEC 9899:2011 on December 8, 2011, with no comments requiring resolution by participating national bodies.

A standard macro __STDC_VERSION__ is defined with value 201112L to indicate that C11 support is available.

== Changes from C99 ==
The standard includes several changes to the C99 language and library specifications, such as

- Alignment specification (_Alignas specifier, _Alignof operator, aligned_alloc() function, <stdalign.h> header)
- The _Noreturn function specifier and the <stdnoreturn.h> header
- Type-generic expressions using the _Generic keyword. For example, the following macro cbrt(x) translates to cbrtl(x), cbrt(x) or cbrtf(x) depending on the type of x:

#define cbrt(x) _Generic((x), long double: cbrtl, \
                              default: cbrt, \
                              float: cbrtf)(x)

- Multi-threading support (_Thread_local storage-class specifier, <threads.h> header including thread creation/management functions, mutex, condition variable and thread-specific storage functionality, as well as <stdatomic.h> for atomic operations supporting the C11 memory model).
- Improved Unicode support based on the C Unicode Technical Report ISO/IEC TR 19769:2004 (char16_t and char32_t types for storing UTF-16/UTF-32 encoded data, including conversion functions in <uchar.h> and the corresponding u and U string literal prefixes, as well as the u8 prefix for UTF-8 encoded literals).
- Removal of the gets() function (in favor of safer fgets()), which was deprecated in the previous C language standard revision, ISO/IEC 9899:1999/Cor.3:2007(E).
- Bounds-checking interfaces (Annex K).
- Analyzability features (Annex L).
- More macros for querying the characteristics of floating-point types, concerning subnormal floating-point numbers and the number of decimal digits the type is able to store.
- Anonymous structure and union members within containing structures or unions, e.g. in

struct MyStruct {
    int tag;
    union {
        float f;
        int n;
    };
    struct {
        int x;
        int y; 
    };
};

- Static assertions, which are evaluated during translation at a later phase than #if and #error, when types are understood by the translator.
- An exclusive create-and-open mode ("x" suffix) for fopen(). This behaves like O_CREAT | O_EXCL in POSIX, which is commonly used for lock files.
- The quick_exit() function as a third way to terminate a program, intended to do at least minimal deinitialization.
- A new timespec_get() function and corresponding structure in <time.h> with a degree of POSIX compatibility.
- Macros for the construction of complex values (partly because real + imaginary * I might not yield the expected value if imaginary is infinite or NaN).

== Optional features ==
The new revision allows implementations to not support certain parts of the standard — including some that had been mandatory to support in the 1999 revision. Programs can use predefined macros to determine whether an implementation supports a certain feature or not.

Optional features in C11
Feature	Feature test macro
Analyzability (Annex L)	__STDC_ANALYZABLE__
Bounds-checking interfaces (Annex K)	__STDC_LIB_EXT1__
Multithreading (<threads.h>)	__STDC_NO_THREADS__
Atomic primitives and types (<stdatomic.h> and the _Atomic type qualifier)	__STDC_NO_ATOMICS__
IEC 60559 floating-point arithmetic (Annex F)	__STDC_IEC_559__
IEC 60559 compatible complex arithmetic (Annex G)	__STDC_IEC_559_COMPLEX__
Complex types (<complex.h>)	__STDC_NO_COMPLEX__
Variable-length arrays	__STDC_NO_VLA__

== Compiler support ==
Some features of C11 are supported by the GCC starting with version 4.6, Clang starting with version 3.1, IBM XL C starting with version 12.1, and Microsoft Visual C++ starting with VS 2019 (16.8) in September 2020.

== Criticism ==
The optional bounds-checking interfaces (Annex K) remain controversial and have not been widely implemented, and their deprecation or removal from the next standard revision has been proposed. Even Microsoft, a main proponent of this interface, does not conform to the definition. In addition, Annex K does not include the more useful TR24731-2 (dynamic allocation functions), such as vasprintf() and open_memstream(). The few open-source implementations include Open Watcom C/C++'s "Safer C" library and safeclib.

== See also ==
- C++11
- Compatibility of C and C++
- Outline of the C programming language

Preceded by C99	C language standards	Succeeded by C17
