= Variable type =

Variable type may refer to:

- Variable star
- The data type of a variable within a programming language's type system
