= Global variable =

Computer programming, a variable accessible throughout a computer program

In computer programming, a global variable is a variable with global scope, meaning that it is visible (hence accessible) throughout the program, unless shadowed. The set of all global variables is known as the global environment or global state. In compiled languages, global variables are generally static variables, whose extent (lifetime) is the entire runtime of the program, though in interpreted languages (including command-line interpreters), global variables are generally dynamically allocated when declared, since they are not known ahead of time.

In some languages, all variables are global, or global by default, while in most modern languages variables have limited scope, generally lexical scope, though global variables are often available by declaring a variable at the top level of the program. In other languages, however, global variables do not exist; these are generally modular programming languages that enforce a module structure, or class-based object-oriented programming languages that enforce a class structure.

== Use ==
Interaction mechanisms with global variables are called global environment (see also global state) mechanisms. The global environment paradigm is contrasted with the local environment paradigm, where all variables are local with no shared memory (and therefore all interactions can be reconducted to message passing).

Global variables are used extensively to pass information between sections of code that do not share a caller/callee relation like concurrent threads and signal handlers. Languages (including C) where each file defines an implicit namespace eliminate most of the problems seen with languages with a global namespace though some problems may persist without proper encapsulation. Without proper locking (such as with a mutex), code using global variables will not be thread-safe except for read only values in protected memory.

== Global-only and global-by-default ==
A number of non-structured programming languages, such as (early versions of) BASIC, COBOL and Fortran I (1956) only provide global variables. Fortran II (1958) introduced subroutines with local variables, and the COMMON keyword for accessing global variables. Usage of COMMON in FORTRAN continued in FORTRAN 77, and influenced later languages such as PL/SQL. Named COMMON groups for globals behave somewhat like structured namespaces. Variables are also global by default in Forth, Lua, Perl, and most shells.

== By language ==
=== C and C++ ===
The C language has no global reserved word (keyword). However, variables declared outside a function have "file scope," meaning they are visible within the file. Variables declared with file scope are visible between their declaration and the end of the compilation unit (.c file) (unless shadowed by a like-named object in a nearer scope, such as a local variable); and they implicitly have external linkage and are thus visible to not only the .c file or compilation unit containing their declarations but also to every other compilation unit that is linked to form the complete program. External linkage, however, is not sufficient for such a variable's use in other files: for a compilation unit to correctly access such a global variable, it will need to know its type. This is accomplished by declaring the variable in each file using the extern keyword. (It will be declared in each file but may be defined in only one.) Such extern declarations are often placed in a shared header file, since it is common practice for all .c files in a project to include at least one .h file: the standard header file errno.h is an example, making the errno variable accessible to all modules in a project. Where this global access mechanism is judged problematic, it can be disabled using the static keyword which restricts a variable to file scope, and will cause attempts to import it with extern to raise a compilation (or linking) error.

An example of a "global" variable in C:

#include <stdio.h>

// This is the file-scope variable (with internal linkage), visible only in
// this compilation unit.
static int shared = 3;

// This one has external linkage (not limited to this compilation unit).
extern int over_shared;

// Also external linkage.
// Global variables without a storage-class specifier have external linkage in C.
int over_shared_too = 2;

static void changeShared() {
    // Reference to the file-scope variable in a function.
    shared = 5;
}

static void localShadow() {
    // Local variable that will hide the global of the same name.
    int shared;

    // This will affect only the local variable and will have no effect on the
    // file-scope variable of the same name.
    shared = 1000;
}

static void paramShadow(int shared) {
    // This will affect only the parameter and will have no effect on the file-
    // scope variable of the same name.
    shared = -shared;
}

int main() {
    // Reference to the file-scope variable.

    printf("%d\n", shared);

    changeShared();
    printf("%d\n", shared);

    localShadow();
    printf("%d\n", shared);

    paramShadow(1);
    printf("%d\n", shared);

    return 0;
}

As the variable is an external one, there is no need to pass it as a parameter to use it in a function besides main. It belongs to every function in the module.

The output will be:

3
5
5
5

=== Java ===
Some languages, like Java, don't have global variables. In Java, all variables that are not local variables are fields of a class. Hence all variables are in the scope of either a class or a method. In Java, static fields (also known as class variables) exist independently of any instances of the class and one copy is shared among all instances; hence public static fields are used for many of the same purposes as global variables in other languages because of their similar "sharing" behavior:

public class Global {
    public static int a;
}

=== PHP ===
PHP has a global keyword and several unusual ways of using global variables. Variables declared outside functions have file scope (which is for most purposes the widest scope). However, they are not accessible inside functions unless imported with the global keyword (i.e., the keyword accesses global variables, it does not declare them).

However, some predefined variables, known as superglobals are always accessible. They are all arrays. A general purpose one is the $GLOBALS superglobal, which contains all the variables defined out of function scope. Changes to its elements change the original variables, and additions create new variables. The superglobals $_POST and $_GET are widely used in web programming.

=== Other languages ===
- In Python and MATLAB a global variable can be declared anywhere with the global keyword.
- Ruby's global variables are distinguished by a '$' sigil. Several predefined globals exist, for example, $$ is the current process ID.

== See also ==
- Local variable
- Non-local variable
- Singleton pattern
- Variables
  - Static variable
  - Dynamic variable
  - External variable
