= Name binding =

Association of data/code with an identifier in software

In computer programming, name binding is the association of a data or code entity with an identifier. An identifier bound to an entity is said to reference that entity. A machine language has no built-in notion of identifiers, but name-entity binding as a service and notation for the programmer is implemented by higher-level programming languages. Binding is intimately connected with scoping, as scope determines which names bind to which entities – at which locations in the program code (lexically) and in which one of the possible execution paths (temporally).

Use of an identifier id in a context that establishes a binding for id is called a binding (or defining) occurrence. In all other occurrences (e.g., in expressions, assignments, and subprogram calls), an identifier stands for what it is bound to; such occurrences are called applied occurrences.

== Rebinding and mutation ==
Rebinding should not be confused with mutation or assignment. Rebinding is a change to the referencing identifier. Assignment is a change to (the referenced) variable. Mutation is a change to an entity in memory, possibly referenced by a variable or bound to an identifier.

Consider the following Java code:

import java.util.LinkedList;

LinkedList<String> list; // implicitly initialised to 'null'
list = new LinkedList<>();
list.add("foo");
list = null;
{ 
    LinkedList<Integer> list = new LinkedList<>(); 
    list.add(2);
}

The identifier list is bound to a variable in the first line; in the second, a linked list of strings is assigned to the variable. The linked list referenced by the variable is then mutated, adding a string to the list. Next, the variable is assigned the constant null. In the last line, the identifier is rebound for the scope of the block. Operations within the block access a new variable and not the variable previously bound to list.

== See also ==
- Branch table – Method of transferring program control to another part of a program
- Binding time – When a binding occurs in software
- Higher-order abstract syntax
