= John Scholes =

John Scholes may refer to:

- John M. Scholes (1948–2019), computer scientist and APL implementer and programmer
- John Scholes (cricketer) (1950–2003), Australian cricketer

== See also ==
- John Skoyles (disambiguation)
