= Tak (function) =

Recursive function

In computer science, the Tak function is a recursive function, named after Ikuo Takeuchi. It is defined as follows:

$$\tau (x,y,z) = \begin{cases}
\tau (\tau (x-1,y,z) ,\tau (y-1,z,x) ,\tau (z-1,x,y) ) & \text{if } y < x \\
z & \text{otherwise}
\end{cases}$$

def tak(x: int, y: int, z: int) -> int:
    if y < x:
        return tak( 
            tak(x - 1, y, z),
            tak(y - 1, z, x),
            tak(z - 1, x, y)
        )
    else:
        return z

This function is often used as a benchmark for languages with optimization for recursion.

== tak() vs. tarai() ==
The original definition by Takeuchi was as follows:

def tarai(x: int, y: int, z: int) -> int:
    if y < x:
        return tarai( 
            tarai(x - 1, y, z),
            tarai(y - 1, z, x),
            tarai(z - 1, x, y)
        )
    else:
        return y  # not z!

tarai is short for たらい回し (tarai mawashi, "to pass around") in Japanese.

John McCarthy named this function tak() after Takeuchi.

However, in certain later references, the y somehow got turned into the z. This is a small, but significant difference because the original version benefits significantly from lazy evaluation.

Though written in exactly the same manner as others, the Haskell code below runs much faster.

tarai :: Int -> Int -> Int -> Int
tarai x y z
    | x <= y    = y
    | otherwise = tarai (tarai (x-1) y z)
                        (tarai (y-1) z x)
                        (tarai (z-1) x y)

One can easily accelerate this function via memoization yet lazy evaluation still wins.

The best known way to optimize tarai is to use a mutually recursive helper function as follows.

def laziest_tarai(x: int, y: int, zx: int, zy: int, zz: int) -> int:
    if not y < x:
        return y
    else:
        return laziest_tarai(
            tarai(x-1, y, z),
            tarai(y-1, z, x),
            tarai(zx, zy, zz)-1, x, y)

def tarai(x: int, y: int, z: int) -> int:
    if not y < x:
        return y
    else:
        return laziest_tarai(
            tarai(x-1, y, z),
            tarai(y-1, z, x),
            z-1, x, y)

Here is an efficient implementation of tarai() in C:

int tarai(int x, int y, int z)
{
    while (x > y) {
        int oldx = x, oldy = y;
        x = tarai(x - 1, y, z);
        y = tarai(y - 1, z, oldx);
        if (x <= y) break;
        z = tarai(z - 1, oldx, oldy);
    }
    return y;
}

Note the additional check for (x <= y) before z (the third argument) is evaluated, avoiding unnecessary recursive evaluation.
