= North Leamington School =

- NLS logo since 2009

Location
- Sandy Lane; Blackdown; Leamington Spa, Warwickshire, CV32 6RD; England; 52°18′35″N 1°31′51″W

Information
- Type: Academy
- Motto: Believe and you will achieve
- Local authority: Warwickshire
- Department for Education URN: 142202 Tables
- Ofsted: Reports
- Chair of governors: Richard Freeth
- Headteacher: Mike Lowdell
- Gender: Coeducational
- Age: 11 to 18
- Enrolment: 1462
- Houses: Binswood; Blackdown; Croft; Manor; Park (known as Colleges)
- Colour: Blue
- Website: https://www.northleamingtonschool.warwickshire.sch.uk

North Leamington School (NLS) is a mixed, non-selective, comprehensive school for students aged 11 to 18 years located at the northeastern edge of Leamington Spa, Warwickshire, England. It is rated as a good school by Ofsted, and has 6.7% of children eligible for free school meals. Mike Lowdell is the current headteacher.

== Admissions and performance ==
North Leamington is a mixed 11 to 18 comprehensive school, an academy since November 2016. It has an enrolment of around 1300, and maximum capacity of 1500 students: 240 for each year group from Years 7 to 11, and 150 for each of Years 12 and 13. Admission to Year 7 (transition from Year 6) is by application to Warwickshire County Council Admissions service. Entry after term one of Year 7 is by application direct to the school. As of September 2020, it is oversubscribed.

In 2019, NLS recorded an above average Progress 8 score of 0.46, with 53% achieving grade 5 or above in GCSE maths and English (compared to 43% average in England), and 76 per cent of students achieving grade 4 or above. At A level, NLS has an above average progress score of 0.32. 60 per cent of pupils were awarded A* to B grades.

== History ==
=== Leamington College ===
Leamington College competed in the Top of the Form radio competition in 1962, which was recorded on Monday 8 October 1962, being broadcast on 25 October 1962, at 8pm on the Light Programme. Four boys competed against girls from Pate's Grammar School in Cheltenham, and lost by one point. Pate's Grammar School lost their next round. The Leamington team were C S Briggs aged 17, Andrew Ellis aged 15, and Peter Sharpe aged 14.

=== Comprehensive ===
North Leamington School was created in 1977 by Warwickshire County Council, with the merger of three schools for 11-16 year olds: Blackdown High School (Park Road site), Leamington College for Girls, a girls grammar school (Cloister Way site) and Leamington College for Boys (Binswood Hall site) on Binswood Avenue. The Cloister Way site became the Lower School for Years 7, 8 and 9, while the Park Road site became the Upper School for Years 10 & 11. The Binswood Hall site became a separate sixth form centre. In 1994 the sixth form fully merged with North Leamington (becoming Years 12 & 13). This resulted in some operational challenges for staff, with teachers having to move between the sites located approximately a mile apart.

NLS was granted specialist school status as a Performing Arts College in 1999, thanks to sponsorship by EMI Music Sound Foundation (now Universal Music UK Sound Foundation) and retained this status until 2008. It was the first Arts College school in Warwickshire.

For September 2009, a new school complex was built on the former site of Manor Hall teacher training and conference centre. The new site on Sandy Lane, just off the B4113 road in the parish of Blackdown, was designed by Robothams Architecture, an architectural firm based in Warwick. The new buildings have a BREEAM 'excellent' rating, and have been given awards by RICS, the Leamington Society, and The Society for Construction and Architecture in Local Authorities. The Humanities Faculty building features a prominent sculpture by Walter Ritchie; Three Aspects of a Girl's Education was commissioned for the old Leamington College for Girls site by Warwickshire Education Committee in 1961, and features figures of Boudica, Florence Nightingale and Marie Curie.

NLS became an academy on 1 November 2016.

The current headteacher of NLS is Mike Lowdell (from 2021). Predecessors include Joy Mitchell (2011–2020), David Hazeldine (-2011), and C.R. Thackery.

=== Former locations ===
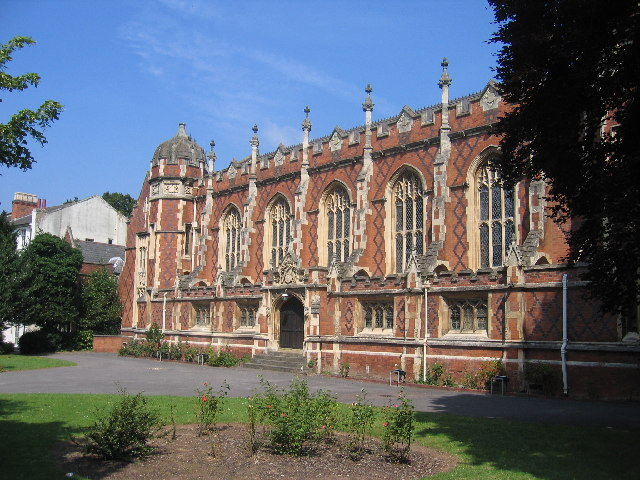
Binswood Hall 2005

Binswood Hall is a Grade II* listed building in the Tudor Revival style, with later additions and alterations including a chapel built in 1867 and gymnasium dating from 1893. Having started as a Girls' Convent School it became Leamington College for Boys, a Boys Grammar School, in 1848. It has now been redeveloped by Audley Retirement as a retirement village of 114 leasehold properties, with a health club and Whittles Restaurant.

The old Park Road site was demolished and used for private housing (with the creation of two new streets, Sir Frank Whittle Gardens and Canberra Mews). The Cloister Way site remained derelict for several years, and was damaged by fire on 20 September 2016. It has since been demolished and is under redevelopment for private housing.

== Colleges ==
Students in years 7-11 are put into one of five colleges: Binswood, Blackdown, Croft, Manor, or Park. Each college has its own leader who is responsible for the pastoral and academic support within their college. Siblings are normally allocated within the same college. From the 2021–22 academic year, NLS has horizontal tutor groups, each made up from students within the same year. This follows 12 years of vertical tutoring (VT).

== Facilities ==
The Central Hub building of NLS has a main hall with sprung floor, 315 retractable seats, and lighting, audio and AV equipment for use as a theatre. There is a dining hall with mezzanine floor for extra seating. The Central Hub also holds the school administration, library, sixth form, and performing arts teaching spaces. These include dance and drama studios, a 62-seat lecture theatre, and music practice rooms.

The Physical Education building contains a gymnasium and a sports hall, both with sprung floors, plus changing rooms and access to outdoor spaces, including an all-weather pitch (with floodlights), grass pitches, and a hard-floored, multi-use games area (MUGA).

There are three academic buildings for teaching, all linked by bridges:

- A three-storey Humanities block, for languages and humanities.
- A three-storey Science and Maths block, for science, maths, and IT.
- A two-storey Design and Technology block for technology, art, photography and IEN (Individual Educational Needs).

== Awards ==
In 2002 the school won Arts Council England's 'Artsmark Gold' award and also gained 'Sportsmark' status from Sport England in 2004. Due to vast improvement in exam results between 2000 and 2003, NLS received a "School Achievement Award" from the government and in addition, the Specialist Schools and Academies Trust Council elected NLS to its 'Most Improved Schools Club'.

== Alumni ==
=== Leamington College for Boys ===
- Sir David Baulcombe, professor of botany since 2007 at the University of Cambridge, and president from 2003 to 2004 of the International Society of Plant Molecular Biology
- Thomas Byles, priest
- D. J. Enright, writer
- Henry James Grasett, chief constable of Toronto from 1886 to 1920
- Edgar Jepson, novelist
- Vivian Dering Majendie, chief inspector of explosives from 1871 to 1898
- Wilfrid Mellers, composer
- Adam Osborne, computing author and businessman
- Norman Painting, actor
- John Scholes, computer scientist
- Charles Spearman, president from 1923 to 1926 of the British Psychological Society, and creator of the Spearman's rank correlation coefficient, used in statistics
- Sir Bernard Spilsbury, took part in the WWII deception for the invasion of Sicily known as Operation Mincemeat, and the father of modern forensics
- Lytton Strachey, writer and critic
- Hugh Whitby, cricketer and schoolmaster
- Sir Frank Whittle, inventor of the jet engine

=== North Leamington School ===
- Jack Burroughs, Coventry City FC footballer
- Ben Foster, Watford F.C. and England international goalkeeper
- Edward ‘Teddy’ Rowe, Aston Villa FC footballer
- Kelly Sibley, Olympic table tennis player
