= John Skoyles =

John Skoyles may refer to:

- John Skoyles (poet) (born 1949), American poet and writer
- John Skoyles (scientist), English neuroscientist and evolutionary psychologist

== See also ==
- John Scholes (disambiguation)
