= Pidgin code =

Mixture of several programming languages in the same program

In computer programming, pidgin code is a mixture of several programming languages in the same program, or mathematical pseudocode that is a mixture of a programming language with natural language descriptions. Hence the name: the mixture is a programming language analogous to a pidgin in natural languages.

== Examples ==
In numerical computation, mathematical style pseudocode is sometimes called pidgin code, for example pidgin ALGOL (the origin of the concept), pidgin Fortran, pidgin BASIC, pidgin Pascal, and pidgin C. It is a compact and often informal notation that blends syntax taken from a conventional programming language with mathematical notation, typically using set theory and matrix operations, and perhaps also natural language descriptions.

It can be understood by a wide range of mathematically trained people, and is used as a way to describe algorithms where the control structure is made explicit at a rather high level of detail, while some data structures are still left at an abstract level, independent of any specific programming language.

Normally non-ASCII typesetting is used for the mathematical equations, for example by means of TeX or MathML markup, or proprietary Formula editor formats.

These are examples of articles that contain mathematical style pseudocode:

- Algorithm
- Conjugate gradient method
- Ford-Fulkerson algorithm
- Gauss–Seidel method
- Generalized minimal residual method
- Jacobi eigenvalue algorithm
- Jacobi method
- Karmarkar's algorithm
- Particle swarm optimization
- Stone method
- Successive over-relaxation
- Symbolic Cholesky decomposition
- Tridiagonal matrix algorithm
