= Awodey =

Awodey is a surname. Notable people with the surname include:

- Marc Awodey (1960–2012), American artist and poet
- Steve Awodey (born 1959), American mathematician and philosopher of mathematics
