= Neil Ghani =

British computer scientist

- Ghani after his PhD defence at the University of Edinburgh, 1995
- Education: Pembroke College, Oxford; Balliol College, Oxford; University of Edinburgh (PhD)
- Known for: Theory of containers; compositional game theory; categorical foundations of machine learning
- Notable work: Theory of containers; compositional game theory
- Scientific career
- Fields: Computer science
- Workplaces: University of Leicester; University of Nottingham; University of Strathclyde; Google DeepMind

Neil Ghani is a British computer scientist known for applying category theory to type theory, the semantics of programming languages, game theory and machine learning. He was a professor of Computer Science at the University of Strathclyde and head of its Department of Computer and Information Sciences from 2017 to 2023, and in October 2024 joined Google DeepMind. He is a cofounder and chief science officer of Kodamai, a Glasgow-based AI agent company. In 2026 Kodamai and the University of Edinburgh were awarded an Innovate UK Knowledge Transfer Partnership on security and privacy assurance for Kodamai's agent platform, with Ghani named as the industrial supervisor.

== Career ==
Ghani studied mathematics at Pembroke College, Oxford, took an MSc in Computation at Balliol College, Oxford, and completed a PhD in computer science at the University of Edinburgh in 1995 with a thesis on adjoint rewriting. He held posts at the University of Leicester and the University of Nottingham before joining Strathclyde as professor of Computer Science in 2008, where he cofounded the Mathematically Structured Programming group. At Strathclyde he served as Associate Dean (Research) of the Faculty of Science from 2014 to 2017 and as head of the Department of Computer and Information Sciences from 2017 to 2023. He joined Google DeepMind in October 2024.

== Research ==
Ghani's research has included applications of category theory to type theory and programming-language semantics. With Thorsten Altenkirch and Michael Abbott he developed the theory of containers, a categorical characterisation of strictly positive data types. He has also worked on induction-recursion, parametricity and fibrational models of dependent type theory, and led EPSRC projects at Strathclyde including Theory and Applications of Induction Recursion and Homotopy Type Theory: Programming and Verification.

With Jules Hedges, Viktor Winschel and Philipp Zahn, Ghani introduced compositional game theory, a framework in which games are treated as open components ("open games") that can be composed sequentially and in parallel, with the equilibria of a composite game determined by those of its parts. Subsequent work with Clemens Kupke, Alasdair Lambert and Fredrik Nordvall Forsberg extended the framework to mixed strategies using a distributive law.

More recently he co-authored a categorical semantics of gradient-based learning algorithms in terms of lenses, parametrised maps and reverse derivative categories. At Google DeepMind he has described using relational parametricity for dependent type theory to generalise geometric deep learning beyond equivariance to other forms of uniformity.
