= UIP =

UIP may refer to:

- uIP (micro IP), an embedded TCP/IP protocol stack intended for small 8-bit and 16-bit microcontrollers
- United Independent Party, a political party based in Massachusetts, United States
- United International Pictures, a film distributor
- Universal Immunization Programme, a vaccination program launched by the Government of India in 1985
- Universidad Interamericana de Panamá, a school in Panama run by Laureate Education
- University of Illinois Press, an American university press
- Usual interstitial pneumonia, a form of lung disease characterized by progressive scarring of both lungs
- Uniqueness of identity proofs, a possible axiom in type theory
- Quimper–Cornouaille Airport (IATA code)
- Fine Gael, a political party in Ireland historically referred to as the “United Ireland Party”
