= Univalent =

Univalent may refer to:

- Univalent function – an injective holomorphic function on an open subset of the complex plane
- Univalent foundations – a type-based approach to foundation of mathematics
- Univalent relation – a binary relation R that satisfies $xRy \text{ and } xRz \text{ implies } y = z.$
- Valence (chemistry)#univalent – 1-valent.
