= Michael Shulman (mathematician) =

American mathematician (born 1980)

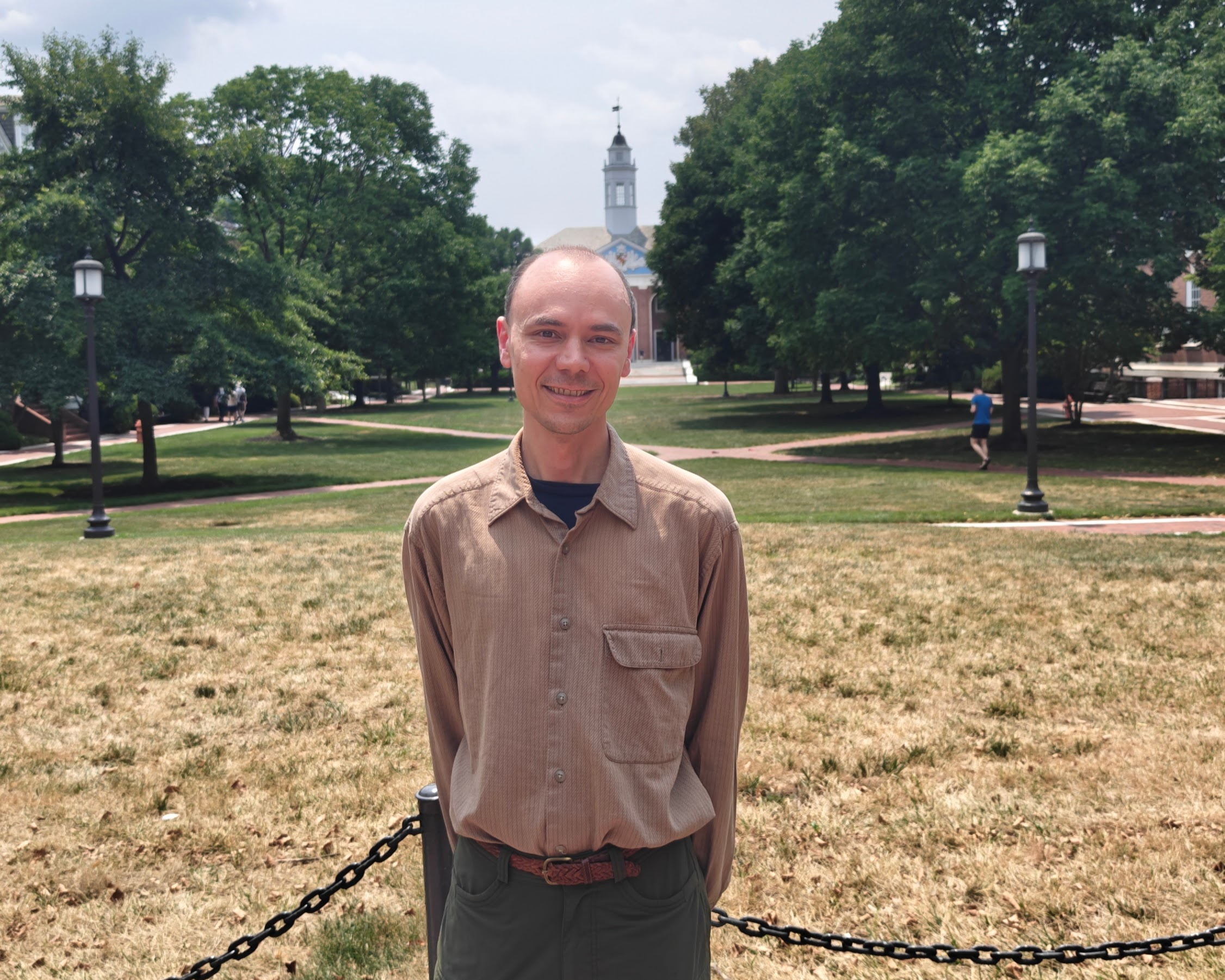
- Born: 1980 (age 45–46); Los Angeles, California

Academic background
- Education: California Institute of Technology; University of Chicago
- Doctoral advisor: J. Peter May

Academic work
- Discipline: Category theory Homological algebra Homotopy type theory
- Institutions: University of San Diego; Institute for Advanced Study

Michael "Mike" Shulman (/ˈʃuːlmən/; born 1980) is an American professor of mathematics at the University of San Diego who works in category theory and higher category theory, homotopy theory, logic as applied to set theory, and computer science.

== Work ==
Shulman did his undergraduate work at the California Institute of Technology and his postgraduate work at the University of Cambridge and the University of Chicago, where he received his Ph.D. in 2009.

His doctoral thesis and subsequent work dealt with applications of category theory to homotopy theory.

In 2009, he received a National Science Foundation Mathematical Sciences Postdoctoral Research Fellowship.

In 2012–13, he was a visiting scholar at the Institute for Advanced Study, where he was one of the official participants in the Special Year on Univalent Foundations of Mathematics. Shulman was one of the principal authors of the book Homotopy type theory: Univalent foundations of mathematics, an informal exposition on the basics of univalent foundations and homotopy type theory. In 2014, Shulman was part of a team headed by Steve Awodey that was awarded a $7.5M grant from the Air Force Research Laboratory for homotopy type theory.

== Social views ==
Shulman is a social conservative, opposing the idea that gender is socially constructed and the use of singular they. In April 2022, organizers of the Homotopy Type Theory Electronic Seminar Talks canceled a distinguished lecture series to be given by Shulman due to statements he made being in conflict with the organization's commitment to diversity in the mathematics community.

== Blogs ==
Shulman is a supporter of using web-based software systems, such as GitHub, to promote collaborative work by mathematicians—the six-hundred-page Homotopy type theory book being a notable example. He is a prolific contributor to the nLab (and a member of its steering committee), and a co-host of the homotopy type theory blog and of the n-Category Cafe, a blog focusing on higher category theory, as well as a blog about Narya proof assistant.

== Selected publications ==
- Michael Shulman; Synthetic Differential Geometry. May 31, 2006.
- Daniel Licata and Michael Shulman; Calculating the fundamental group of the circle in homotopy type theory. January 15, 2013.
- Benedikt Ahrens, Chris Kapulkin, and Michael Shulman; Univalent categories and the Rezk completion. March 4, 2013.
- Michael Shulman – In Cambridge Journals Special Issue: From type theory and homotopy theory to Univalent Foundations of Mathematics; Univalence for inverse diagrams and homotopy canonicity. November 23, 2013.
- John C. Baez and Michael Shulman; Lectures on $n$-categories and cohomology In Baez, John C.; May, J. Peter, eds. (2009). Towards Higher Categories. Springer. ISBN 978-1441915238..
