= Thorsten Altenkirch =

German professor of computer science

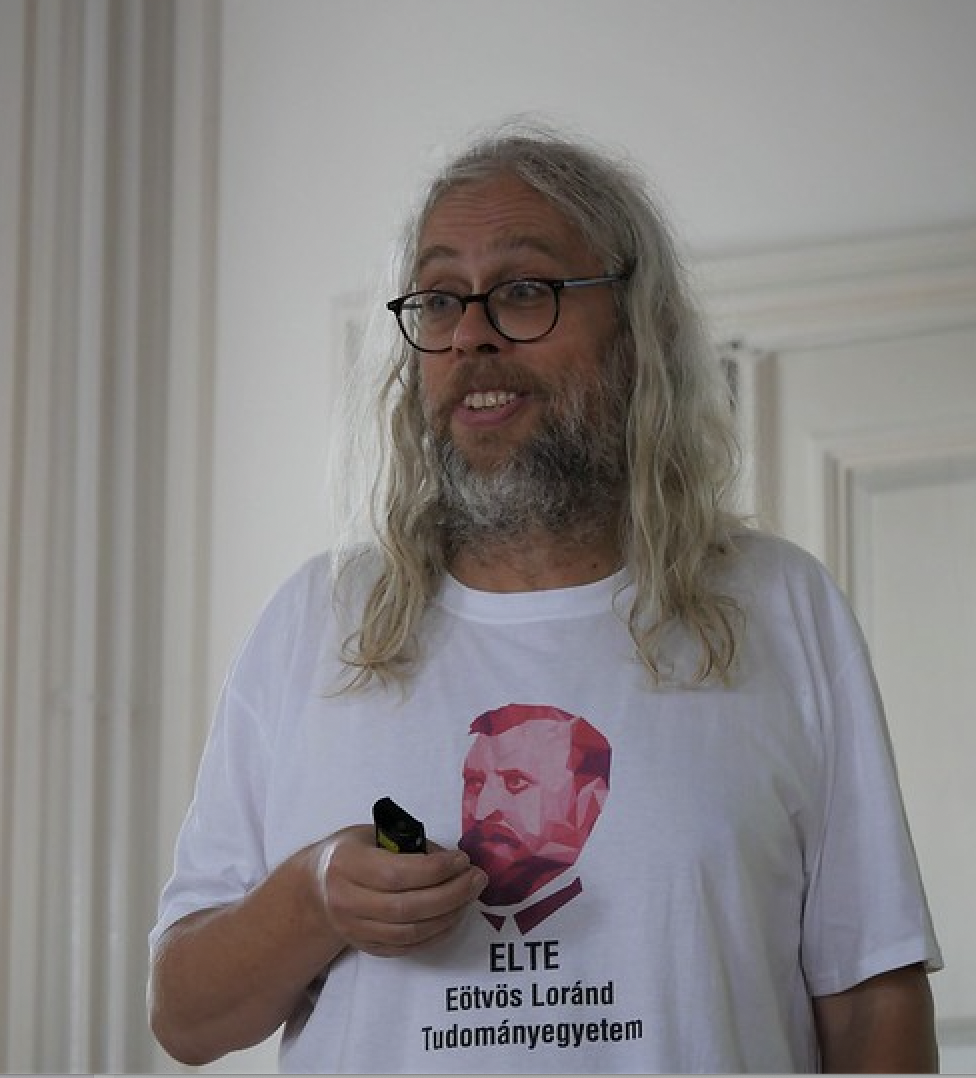
- Thorsten Altenkirch in Schlehdorf (2022)
- Education: University of Edinburgh
- Scientific career
- Fields: Constructive mathematics Type theory Homotopy type theory
- Institutions: University of Nottingham; Institute for Advanced Study
- Doctoral advisor: Rod Burstall

Thorsten Altenkirch (/ˈɔːltənkɜːrʃ/ AWL-tən-kursh, German: [ˈtɔʁstn̩ ˈʔaltn̩kɪʁç]) is a German Professor of Computer Science at the University of Nottingham known for his research on logic, type theory, and homotopy type theory. Altenkirch was part of the 2012/2013 special year on univalent foundations at the Institute for Advanced Study. At Nottingham he co-chairs the Functional Programming Laboratory with Graham Hutton.

== Education ==
Altenkirch obtained his PhD from the University of Edinburgh in 1993 under Rod Burstall.

== Contributions ==
Altenkirch's work includes: Containers, Epigram programming language, and Homotopy Type Theory: Univalent Foundations of Mathematics (The HoTT Book).

Altenkirch has also been a guest on the YouTube channel Computerphile.
