= Steve Awodey =

American mathematician (born 1959)

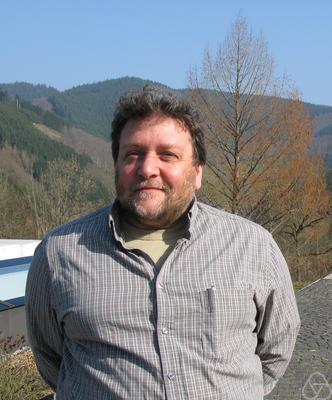
- Awodey in 2011
- Born: Steven M. Awodey; July 5, 1959 (age 67); Michigan
- Education: University of Marburg; University of Chicago
- Known for: Model theory of higher-order logic using the methods of category theory Type theory of higher-dimensional categories
- Scientific career
- Fields: Category theory, homotopy type theory
- Workplaces: Carnegie Mellon University
- Thesis: Logic in Topoi: Functorial Semantics for Higher-Order Logic (1997)
- Doctoral advisors: Saunders Mac Lane
- Other academic advisors: William Walker Tait
- Website: www.andrew.cmu.edu/user/awodey/

Steven M. Awodey (/ˈaʊdi/; born 1959) is an American mathematician and logician. He is a Professor of Philosophy and Mathematics at Carnegie Mellon University.

== Biography ==
Awodey studied mathematics and philosophy at the University of Marburg and the University of Chicago. He earned his Ph.D. from Chicago under Saunders Mac Lane in 1997. He is an active researcher in the areas of category theory and logic, and has also written on the philosophy of mathematics. He is one of the originators of the field of homotopy type theory. He was a member of the School of Mathematics at the Institute for Advanced Study in 2012–13.

== Personal life ==
Awodey is the brother of late artist Marc Awodey.

== Bibliography ==
- Eric H. Reck; Steve Awodey, eds. (2004). Frege's Lectures on Logic: Carnap's Student Notes, 1910-1914. Translated by Eric H. Reck; Steve Awodey. Chicago: Open Court. pp. xiv+170 p.
- Awodey, Steve (2010) [2006]. Category Theory (2nd ed.). Oxford & New York: Oxford University Press. ISBN 978-0-19-9237-18-0.
