= Thomas Streicher =

Austrian mathematician (1958–2025)

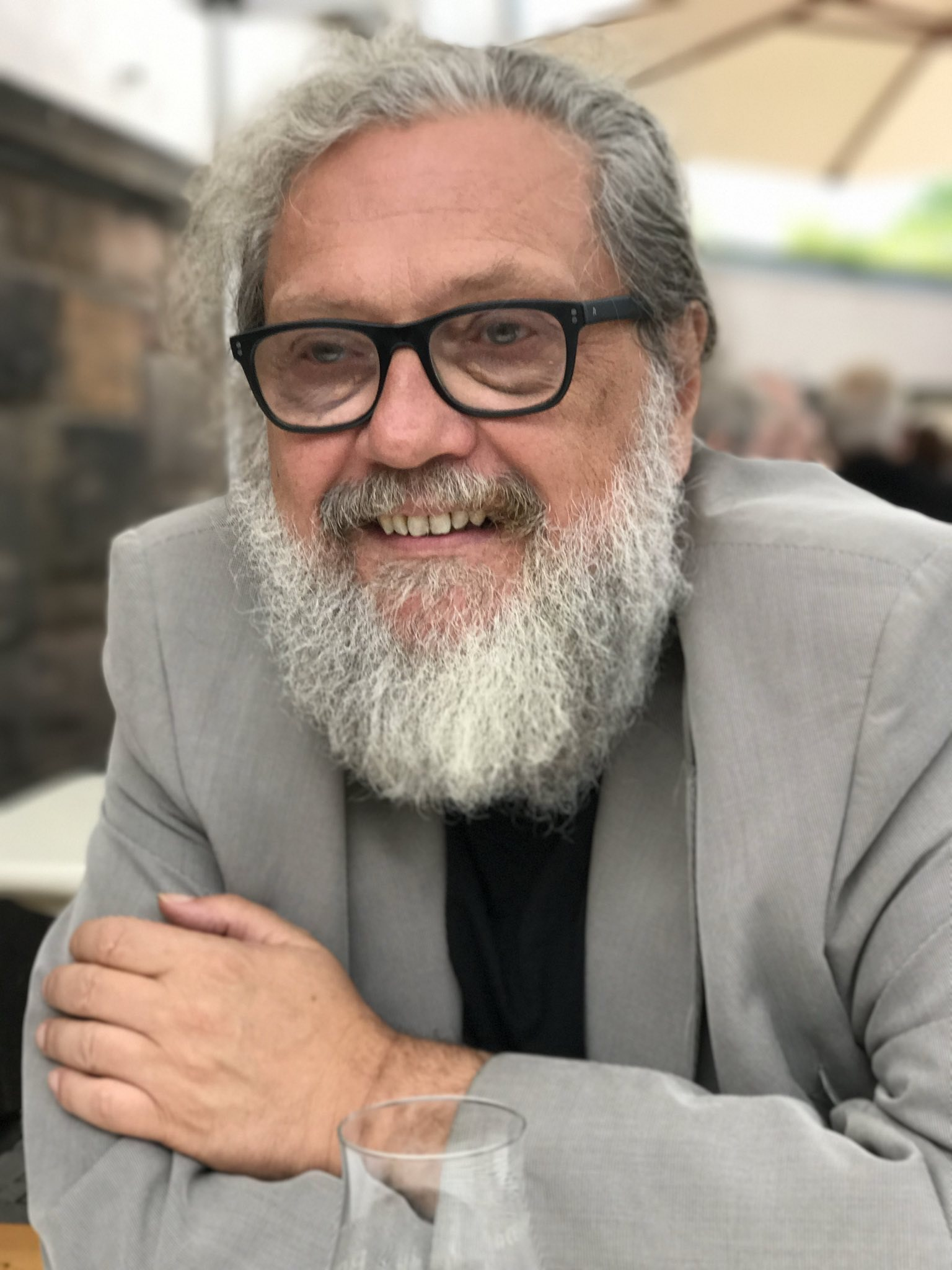
Portrait Thomas Streicher 2017

Thomas Streicher (11 February 1958 – 2 January 2025) was an Austrian mathematician who was a Professor of Mathematics at Technische Universität Darmstadt. He received his PhD in 1988 from the University of Passau with advisor Manfred Broy.

== Life and work ==
Streicher's research interests included categorical logic, domain theory and Martin-Löf type theory.

In joint work with Martin Hofmann he constructed a model for intensional Martin-Löf type theory where identity types are interpreted as groupoids. This was the first model with non-trivial identity types, i.e. other than sets. Based on this work other models with non-trivial identity types were studied, including homotopy type theory which has been proposed as a foundation for mathematics in Vladimir Voevodsky's research program Univalent Foundations of Mathematics.

Together with Martin Hofmann he received the 2014 LICS Test-of-Time Award for the paper: The groupoid model refutes uniqueness of identity proofs.

Streicher died on 2 January 2025, at the age of 66.

== Bibliography ==
- T. Streicher (1991), Semantics of Type Theory: Correctness, Completeness, and Independence Results, Birkhäuser Boston. ISBN 3764335947
- M. Hofmann and T. Streicher (1996), The groupoid interpretation of type theory, in Sambin, Giovanni (ed.) et al., Twenty-five years of constructive type theory. Proceedings of a congress, Venice, Italy, October 19–21, 1995.
- T. Streicher (2006), Domain-theoretic Foundations of Functional Programming, World Scientific Pub Co Inc. ISBN 9812701427
