= Higher order grammar =

Higher order grammar (HOG) is a grammar theory based on higher-order logic. It can be viewed simultaneously as generative-enumerative (like categorial grammar and principles and parameters) or model theoretic (like head-driven phrase structure grammar or lexical functional grammar).

== Key features ==
- There is a propositional logic of types, which denote sets of linguistic (phonological, syntactic, or semantic) entities. For example, the type NP denotes the syntactic category (or form class) of noun phrases.
- HOG maintains Haskell Curry's distinction between tectogrammatical structure (abstract syntax) and phenogrammatical structure (concrete syntax).
- Abstract syntactic entities are identified with structuralist (Bloomfield-Hockett) free forms (words and phrases). For example, the NP your cat is distinct from its phonology or its semantics.
- Concrete syntax is identified with phonology, broadly construed to include word order.
- The modelling of Fregean senses is broadly similar to Montague's, but with intensions replaced by finer-grained hyperintensions.
- There is a (Curry-Howard) proof term calculus, whose terms denote linguistic (phonological, syntactic, or semantic) entities.
- The term calculus is embedded in a classical higher-order logic (HOL).
- The syntax-phonology and syntax-semantics interfaces are expressed as axiomatic theories in the HOL.
- The HOL admits (separation-style) subtyping, e.g. NPacc, the type of accusative noun phrases, is a subtype of NP, and denotes a subset of the category denoted by NP.
