= Marc Awodey =

American artist and poet

Marc Awodey (November 4, 1960 — October 13, 2012) was an American contemporary artist and poet.

== Work ==
His poetry collections include "Telegrams from the Psych Ward" (1999), "New York City; "Head to Head" Haiku (Paperback) The Minimal Press (2001); A Haibun Journey" (2003). and "Senryu and Nudes" (2008) from Kasini House Books. He also authored the collection of essays "Art and Machine: 95 theses" (2004) discussing his poetry vending machine project of the late 1990s. Awodey's paintings can be found in the Vermont State House collection and in many private collections throughout the United States. A prominent solo exhibition of his paintings was held in the lobby of the Vermont Supreme Court from January 13 through February 15, 2008.

Awodey studied painting under George Earl Ortman at Cranbrook Academy of Art, and received an MFA from Cranbrook in 1984. He lived in Burlington, Vermont and served on the faculty of Burlington College Community College of Vermont, and Johnson State College. As an art critic, Awodey wrote over 500 reviews for Vermont's alternative weekly Seven Days. He also wrote for Art New England.

He was also one of the first Vermont Justices of the Peace to perform civil unions in 2000.

Following his untimely death, a memorial tribute featuring many prominent Vermont artists, poets, and musicians was held on November 2, 2012, in the Unitarian Universalist Church in Burlington, Vermont, where his last remains are interred.

== Personal life ==
Awodey was the brother of mathematician Steve Awodey.
