= Automath =

Formal languages for expressing mathematical theories

Automath ("automating mathematics") is a formal language, devised by Nicolaas Govert de Bruijn starting in 1967, for expressing complete mathematical theories in such a way that an included automated proof checker can verify their correctness.

== Overview ==
The Automath system included many novel notions that were later adopted and/or reinvented in areas such as typed lambda calculus and explicit substitution. Dependent types is one outstanding example. Automath was also the first practical system that exploited the Curry–Howard correspondence. Propositions were represented as sets (called "categories") of their proofs, and the question of provability became a question of non-emptiness (type inhabitation); de Bruijn was unaware of Howard's work, and stated the correspondence independently.

L. S. van Benthem Jutting, as part of this Ph.D. thesis in 1976, translated Edmund Landau's Foundations of Analysis into Automath and checked its correctness.

Automath was never widely publicized at the time, however, and so never achieved widespread use; nonetheless, it proved very influential in the later development of logical frameworks and proof assistants. The Mizar system, a system of writing and checking formalized mathematics that is still in active use, was influenced by Automath.

== See also ==
- QED manifesto
