= List of Haskell software and tools =

List of software related to the Haskell programming language

This is a list of Haskell software and tools, including compilers, interpreters, build tools, package managers, integrated development environments, libraries, and other development utilities.

== Compilers, interpreters and editors ==
- Emacs — text editor
- Glasgow Haskell Compiler (GHC)
- Hugs — bytecode interpreter (discontinued)
- IntelliJ IDEA — IDE with Haskell support via plugins
- Vim — text editor
- Visual Studio Code — editor/IDE with Haskell support via extensions

== Libraries and frameworks ==
- Parsec — parser combinator library
- Servant — web framework
- Yesod — web framework

== Build tools and package management ==
- Cabal — build system and packaging infrastructure
- Haskell Platform — bundled distribution of Haskell tools and libraries (deprecated)
- Stack — build tool and dependency manager

== Language tools and static analysis ==
- Fourmolu — code formatter based on Ormolu
- Haskell Language Server — implementation of the Language Server Protocol for Haskell
- HLint — source code suggestion and linting tool
- Hoogle — Haskell API search engine
- Ormolu — code formatter
- Stan — static analysis tool
- Stylish Haskell — source code formatter

== Interactive environments ==
- GHCi — interactive REPL for the Glasgow Haskell Compiler
- IHaskell — Jupyter kernel for Haskell

== Debugging and profiling tools ==
- hp2ps — heap profiling visualization tool
- ThreadScope — parallel execution visualizer for Haskell programs

== Documentation generators ==
- Haddock — API documentation generator for Haskell

== Parser and lexer generators ==
- Alex — lexer generator for Haskell
- Happy — parser generator for Haskell

== Testing frameworks ==
- HUnit — unit testing framework
- QuickCheck — property-based testing library

== Version control ==
- Darcs — distributed version control system written in Haskell

== See also ==
- Haskell
- Related languages to Haskell
- List of free software programmed in Haskell
- Lists of programming software development tools
