= Parsec (parser) =

Haskell library for writing parsers

- Original authors: Daan Leijen, Paolo Martini, Antoine Latter
- Developers: Herbert Valerio Riedel, Derek Elkins, Antoine Latter, Roman Cheplyaka, Ryan Scott
- Initial release: November 2, 2006; 19 years ago
- Stable release: 3.1.17.0 / April 5, 2024; 21 months ago
- Repository: github.com/haskell/parsec
- Written in: Haskell
- Operating system: Linux, macOS, Windows
- Platform: Haskell Platform
- Available in: English
- Type: Parser combinator, library
- License: BSD-2-clause
- Website: hackage.haskell.org/package/parsec

Parsec is a library for writing parsers written in the programming language Haskell. It is based on higher-order parser combinators, so a complicated parser can be made out of many smaller ones. It has been reimplemented in many other languages, including Erlang, Elixir, OCaml, Racket, F#, and the imperative programming languages C#, and Java.

Because a parser combinator-based program is generally slower than a parser generator-based program, Parsec is normally used for small domain-specific languages, while Happy is used for compilers such as the Glasgow Haskell Compiler (GHC).

Other Haskell parser combinator libraries that have been derived from Parsec include Megaparsec and Attoparsec.

Parsec is free software released under the BSD-3-Clause license.

== Example ==
Parsers written in Parsec start with simpler parsers, such as ones that recognize certain strings, and combine them to build a parser with more complicated behavior. For example, digit parses a digit, and string parses a specific string (like "hello").

Parser combinator libraries like Parsec provide utility functions to run the parsers on real values. A parser to recognize a single digit from a string can be split into two functions: one to create the parser, and a main function that calls one of these utility functions (parse in this case) to run the parser:

import Text.Parsec      -- has general parsing utility functions
import Text.Parsec.Char -- contains specific basic combinators
type Parser = Stream s m Char => ParsecT s u m String

parser :: Parser
parser = string "hello"

main :: IO ()
main = print (parse parser "<test>" "hello world")
-- prints 'Right "hello"'

We define a Parser type to make the type signature of parser easier to read. If we wanted to alter this program, say to read either the string "hello" or the string "goodbye", we could use the operator <|>, provided by the Alternative typeclass, to combine two parsers into a single parser that tries either:

parser = string "hello" <|> string "goodbye"
