= Yhc =

The York Haskell Compiler (Yhc) is a no longer maintained open source bytecode compiler for the functional programming language Haskell; it primarily targets the Haskell '98 standard. It is one of the four main Haskell compilers (behind GHC, Hugs and nhc98). Yhc is based on the nhc98 Haskell compiler, and is intended eventually to be a more portable, cleaner, better performing rewrite of nhc98 with more and better features. In particular, Yhc features integrated support for Hat, the Haskell tracer. The Yhc project uses Darcs for version control. It was originally developed at the Department of Computer Science at the University of York in the UK.
