= Launchbury =

Launchbury is a surname. Notable people with the surname include:

- Joe Launchbury (born 1991), English rugby union player
- John Launchbury, American-British computer scientist
