= Gofer (programming language) =

Educational programming language

Gofer (Good for equational reasoning) is an implementation of the programming language Haskell intended for educational purposes and supporting a language based on version 1.2 of the Haskell report. It was replaced by Hugs.

Its syntax is closer to the earlier commercial language Miranda than the subsequently standardized Haskell. It lacks some of the features of Haskell (such as the deriving clause in data type definitions), but includes several features which were not adopted by Haskell (although some were later incorporated into Glasgow Haskell Compiler (GHC), such as generalizing the list comprehension syntax to support any monad, which is now available using the MonadComprehensions extension).
