= Omega interpreter =

Omega
- Original author: Tim Sheard
- Developer: Portland State University
- Initial release: March 3, 2005; 20 years ago
- Stable release: 1.5 / April 29, 2011; 14 years ago
- Operating system: Cross-platform
- Type: Interpreter
- License: BSD 3-clause
- Website: web.cecs.pdx.edu/~sheard/Omega

The Omega interpreter (sometimes written as Ωmega) is a strict pure functional programming interpreter similar to the Hugs Haskell interpreter. The syntax closely resembles that of Haskell but with important differences:

- Omega uses strict evaluation (Hugs uses lazy evaluation);
- Ability to introduce new kinds;
- Allows writing functions at the type level.

Other differences are documented in the Omega user guide.

Omega was developed by Professor Tim Sheard of Portland State University's Computer Science Department as a language with an infinite hierarchy of computational levels, e.g., value, type, kind, sort. The underlying concept is that data, and functions manipulating data, can be introduced at any level.
