= Row polymorphism =

Kind of polymorphism

In programming language type theory, row polymorphism is a kind of polymorphism that allows one to write programs that are structurally (rather than nominally) polymorphic on record types and/or variants.

== History ==
Row types and row polymorphism were introduced by Mitchell Wand in the late 1980s as an approach to structurally typing extensible records and variants. The principal motivation for rows (and other structural typing paradigms of that time, most notably subtyping relatons) was to safely type emerging object-oriented patterns for object inheritance and extension. More specifically, Wand defined row types in order to model complete type inference for multiple inheritance of objects. As observed by Rémy, Wand's original type inference algorithm was not complete due to an ambiguity in overlap resolution, which was later corrected by both Rémy and Wand. Wand's original system permitted records to be constructed only by extension (that is, one field at a time), but would later show that type inference remains decidable in the presence of record concatenation, albeit without principal types.

While Wand and Remy's initial row type systems supported variant construction, the bulk of attention focused on record extensibility. Gaster and Jones give a more uniform treatment and additionally introduce type constraints on row variables to specify row equality. In contrast to Remy's presence polymorphism, they likewise use the language of qualified types to specify label presence via a lacks predicate.

Blume et al. take the approach one step further into the realm of composable extensions by adding "first-class cases" handled by a LetCC construct to compose continuations in the case-matching code.

In the modern day, row types are most commonly used to type extensible algebraic effects. For example, (Links, Koka) have used row polymorphism as the type basis of an algebraic effects system, aiming for "free composition" of user-defined effects.

Morris and McKinna generalized row types to partial monoids, dubbed row theories, to uniformly handle varying notions of record and variant-eliminator concatenation in a single theoretical framework. For instance, one application may desire concatenation to overwrite existing fields in case of overlapping labels, while another may want to keep both of them accessible (and have one label scope the other). Their system Rose abstracts over arbitrary row theories, where the particular resolution of label overlaps is subject to the meaning of a row combination predicate, $\rho_1 \oplus \rho_2 \sim \rho_3$, which is satisfied precisely when the combination of rows $\rho_1$ and $\rho_2$ is both (1) well-defined and (2) equal to $\rho_3$. This predicate need not be satisfiable in all cases (hence the monoid is partial). For example, it is not always satisfied in row theories barring label overlap. The authors show that type inference remains decidable for their system.

== Theory ==
Row type systems vary by author and have no universally accepted criteria, however it is generally accepted that a row system should at minimum permit rows and (at least one of) record and variant types. Formally, a row is an association of labels to types. When constructing a record, the labels of a row refer to the accessor (or, destructor) names, while the types in the row refer to the output types. For example, a two-dimensional point may be specified by the row

$\text{row Point} = \{x : \text{Int}, y : \text{Int} \}$

and a record is constructed via the application of the type operator $\Pi$ (for product) to this row:

$p : \Pi\, \text{Point}$

$p = (x := 1, y := 2)$

Dually, when constructing a variant, the labels of a row refer to constructor names, and the types of a row refer to the input types. The Bool type is a simple variant, with constructors true and false and nullary input, as captured by the following row:

$\text{row Bool} = \{\text{True} : \top, \text{False} : \top \}$

(We use the unit type $\top$ to simulate nullary constructors.) The type constructor $\Sigma$ (for sum) constructs the Boolean variant. Variants are most typically constructed by injection, which can be expressed either explicitly (as done so below) or implicitly (via a subtyping relation and implicit coercions).

$\text{true} : \Sigma\, \text{Bool}$

$\text{true} = \text{inj}\,(\text{True} = \text{tt})$

Row polymorphism refers specifically to the quantification of row type variables, which can be specified via a kind system when necessary. For example, record projection is defined polymorphically over rows $\rho_1$ and $\rho_2$ subject to the condition that the output record (constructed via $\Pi\,\rho_1$) has a subset of the fields in the input record of type $\Pi\, \rho_2$.

$\text{prj} : \rho_1 \leq \rho_2 \Rightarrow \Pi \rho_2 \to \Pi \rho_1$

(The syntax above presumes a qualified type system, in which the predicate $\rho_1 \leq \rho_2$ constrains the type instantiations of the row variable $\rho_1$ to just rows that contain a subset of fields in (the instantiation of) row variable $\rho_2$). Dually, variant injection is defined polymorphically over rows $\rho_1$ and $\rho_2$ subject to the condition that the input variant (constructed via $\rho_1$) has a subset of the fields in the output variant (constructed via $\rho_2$).

$\text{inj} : \rho_1 \leq \rho_2 \Rightarrow \Sigma \rho_1 \to \Sigma \rho_2$

The theoretical treatment of row polymorphism is somewhat complicated by the need to have distinct labels in a record. One approach, taken by Rémy and colleagues (and implicitly present in the presentation below, which is heavily inspired by Wand's), is to consider different kinds of row types, depending on their labels.

== Row-polymorphic record type definition ==
The row-polymorphic record type defines a list of fields with their corresponding types, a list of missing fields, and a variable indicating the absence or presence of arbitrary additional fields. Both lists are optional, and the variable may be constrained. Specifically, the variable may be "empty", indicating that no additional fields may be present for the record.

It may be written as $\{\ell_1 : T_1, \dots, \ell_n : T_n, \text{absent}(f_1), \dots, \text{absent}(f_m), \rho\}$. This indicates a record type that has fields $\ell_i$ with respective types of $T_i$ (for $i = 1 \dots n$), and does not have any of the fields $f_j$ (for $j = 1 \dots m$), while $\rho$ expresses the fact the record may contain other fields than $\ell_i$.

Row-polymorphic record types allow us to write programs that operate only on a section of a record. For example, one may define a function that performs some two-dimensional transformation that accepts a record with two or more coordinates, and returns an identical type:

$$\text{transform2d} : \{x : \text{Number}, y : \text{Number}, \rho\} \to \{x : \text{Number}, y : \text{Number}, \rho\}$$

Thanks to row polymorphism, the function may perform two-dimensional transformation on a three-dimensional (in fact, n-dimensional) point, leaving the z coordinate (or any other coordinates) intact. In a more general sense, the function can perform on any record that contains the fields x and y with type $\text{Number}$. There is no loss of information: the type ensures that all the fields represented by the variable $\rho$ are present in the return type. In contrast, the type definition $\{x : \text{Number}, y : \text{Number}, \mathbf{empty}\}$ expresses the fact that a record of that type has exactly the x and y fields and nothing else. In this case, a classic record type is obtained.

== Typing operations on records ==
The record operations of selecting a field $r.\ell$, adding a field $r[\ell:=e]$, and removing a field $r \backslash \ell$ can be given row-polymorphic types.

$$\mathrm{select_\ell} = \lambda r. (r.\ell) \;:\; \{ \ell : T, \rho \} \rightarrow T$$

$$\mathrm{add_\ell} = \lambda r. \lambda e. r[\ell := e] \;:\; \{\mathrm{absent}(\ell), \rho\} \rightarrow T \rightarrow \{\ell : T, \rho\}$$

$$\mathrm{remove_\ell} = \lambda r. r \backslash \ell \;:\; \{\ell : T, \rho\} \rightarrow \{\mathrm{absent}(\ell), \rho \}$$

== Implementations ==
Row polymorphism is not supported in Standard ML, but is in some extensions or derivatives such as SML# and Ocaml.

The very existence of SML#'s first version was motivated by adding row polymorphism, based on a SIGMOD '89 paper by Ohori et al., which introduced the "Machiavelli" extension to SML, although its name was changed later to "SML# of Kansai", before settling on the shorter name. The '#' in the name bears no relationship with F#, but is due to the # operator used to implicitly define the row-polymorphic types on field access.

In Ocaml, row polymorphism is used by Ocaml's object types and also by its polymorphic variants. Ordinary record types are not row-polymorphic in Ocaml. Castagna et al. have criticized Ocaml for lacking flow-sensitive typing, which is particularly noticeable in the type inference for polymorphic variants. They also note that since Ocaml lacks true, untagged union types, some of the inferred types for polymorphic variants are too restrictive, in particular when product types are used in combination with polymorphic variants.

F# can simulate row polymorphism using its "Statically Resolved Type Parameters" (SRTP) mechanism, which has also been informally called "static duck typing". This however is limited to inline F# functions, so that they are not exported to the .NET type system, which itself does not support such a feature.

Row polymorphism is also supported in PureScript.

== See also ==
- Type theory
- Type systems
- Records (tagged products)
- Variants (tagged sums)
- algebraic data types
- Subtyping
- Structural subtyping
- Inheritance
- multiple inheritance
- Polymorphism
- algebraic effects
- intersection types
