= Connor McBride =

Connor McBride may refer to:-

- Connor McBride (ice hockey) (b. 1991), see 2011–12 NAHL season
- Connor McBride (footballer) (b. 2001), Scottish footballer, see 2024–25 Rochdale A.F.C. season

== See also ==
- Conor McBride (b. 1973), Reader in the department of Computer and Information Sciences
