= QuickCheck =

Software testing software

- Developers: Koen Claessen, John Hughes
- Initial release: 1999; 27 years ago
- Stable release: 2.14.2 / 14 November 2020; 5 years ago
- Written in: Haskell
- Operating system: Unix-like, Windows
- Available in: English
- Type: Software testing
- License: BSD-style
- Website: www.cse.chalmers.se/~rjmh/QuickCheck
- Repository: github.com/nick8325/quickcheck

QuickCheck is a software library, a combinator library, originally written in the programming language Haskell, designed to assist in software testing by generating test cases for test suites – an approach known as property testing.

== Software ==
It is compatible with the compiler, Glasgow Haskell Compiler (GHC) and the interpreter, Haskell User's Gofer System (Hugs). It is free and open-source software released under a BSD-style license.

In QuickCheck, assertions are written about logical properties that a function should fulfill. Then QuickCheck attempts to generate a test case that falsifies such assertions. Once such a test case is found, QuickCheck tries to reduce it to a minimal failing subset by removing or simplifying input data that are unneeded to make the test fail.

The project began in 1999. Besides being used to test regular programs, QuickCheck is also useful for building up a functional specification, for documenting what functions should be doing, and for testing compiler implementations.

Re-implementations of QuickCheck exist for many languages:

- C
- C++
- Chicken
- Clojure
- Common Lisp
- D
- Elm
- Elixir
- Erlang
- F#, and C#, Visual Basic (.NET) (VB.NET)
- Factor
- Go
- Io
- Java
- JavaScript
- Julia
- Logtalk
- Lua
- Mathematica
- Objective-C
- OCaml
- Perl
- Prolog
- PHP
- Pony
- Python
- R
- Racket
- Rocq
- Ruby
- Rust
- Scala
- Scheme
- Smalltalk
- Standard ML
- Swift
- TypeScript
- Whiley

== See also ==
- Metamorphic testing
- SPIN model checker
- Software testing#Property testing
