= Conor McBride =

Computer scientist

Conor Titania McBride
- Born: 18 February 1973 (age 53); Newtownards, Northern Ireland
- Education: University of Edinburgh
- Scientific career
- Fields: Computer science Type theory
- Workplaces: Durham University; Royal Holloway, University of London; University of Strathclyde
- Thesis: Dependently Typed Functional Programs and their Proofs (1999)
- Website: strictlypositive.org

Conor Titania McBride (born 18 February 1973) is a reader in the department of Computer and Information Sciences at the University of Strathclyde. In 1999, they completed a Doctor of Philosophy (Ph.D.) in Dependently Typed Functional Programs and their Proofs at the University of Edinburgh for their work in type theory. They formerly worked at Durham University and briefly at Royal Holloway, University of London before joining the academic staff at the University of Strathclyde.

They were involved with developing international standards in programming and informatics, as a member of the International Federation for Information Processing (IFIP) IFIP Working Group 2.1 on Algorithmic Languages and Calculi, which specified, maintains, and supports the programming languages ALGOL 60 and ALGOL 68.

They favor and often use the language Haskell.

== Research ==
Their most notable research is in the field of type theory. They cocreated the programming language Epigram with James McKinna. Several of their articles, including the joint-written article defining the Epigram language, have been published in the Journal of Functional Programming. They are also known for introducing applicative functors to Haskell alongside Ross Paterson in their 2008 paper Applicative programming with effects.

== Selected bibliography ==
- with Dagand, Pierre-Evariste (2014). "Transporting Functions across Ornaments". ACM SIGPLAN Notices. 47 (9): 103–114. arXiv:1201.4801. doi:10.1145/2398856.2364544.
- with Benton, Nick; Hur, Chung-Kil; Kennedy, Andrew J. (August 2012). "Strongly Typed Term representations in Coq" (PDF). Journal of Automated Reasoning. 49 (2): 141–159. doi:10.1007/s10817-011-9219-0. S2CID 34005862.
- with Chapman, James; Dagand, Pierre-Evariste; Morris, Peter (September 2010). "The gentle art of levitation" (PDF). ACM SIGPLAN Notices. 45 (9): 3–14. doi:10.1145/1932681.1863547.
- with Paterson, Ross (January 2008). "Applicative programming with effects" (PDF). Journal of Functional Programming. 18 (1): 1–13. doi:10.1017/S0956796807006326.
- with Altenkirch, Thorsten; Morris, Peter (2007). "Generic Programming with Dependent Types" (PDF). Datatype-Generic Programming. Lecture Notes in Computer Science. Vol. 4719. pp. 209–257.
- with Altenkirch, Thorsten; McKinna, James. Why Dependent Types Matter (PDF).
- with Altenkirch, Thorsten, eds. (2007). Types for Proofs and Programs: International Workshop. Springer. ISBN 978-3540744634.
- – (2006). "A Few Constructions on Constructors". Types for Proofs and Programs. Lecture Notes in Computer Science. Vol. 3839. pp. 186–200.
- – (2005). "Epigram: Practical Programming with Dependent Types" (PDF). Advanced Functional Programming. Lecture Notes in Computer Science. Vol. 3622. pp. 130–170.
- with McKinna, James (January 2004). "The view from the left" (PDF). Journal of Functional Programming. 14 (1): 69–111. doi:10.1017/s0956796803004829. S2CID 6232997.
- with Abbott, Michael; Altenkirch, Thorsten; Ghani, Neil (2003). "Derivatives of Containers" (PDF). Proceedings of the 6th International Conference on Typed Lambda Calculi and Applications: 16–30.
- – (2002). "Elimination with a Motive" (PDF). Types for Proofs and Programs. Lecture Notes in Computer Science. Vol. 2277. pp. 197–216.
- – (2001). The Derivative of a Regular Type is its Type of One-Hole Contexts (PDF).
- – (2000). Dependently Typed Functional Programs and their Proofs (PDF). University of Edinburgh College of Science and Engineering.

== Video lectures ==
- McBride, Conor (3 February 2011). Dependently Typed Programming: An Agda Introduction (first of 15 lectures) (video). Iain McGinniss.
- McBride, Conor (10 September 2012). ICFP 2012 Monday keynote. Conor McBride: Agda-curious? (video). Malcolm Wallace.
