= Haskell Platform =

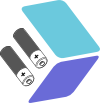
- Developer: Haskell Platform Infrastructure Team
- Release: May 6, 2009; 17 years ago
- Stable release: 8.6.5 / May 9, 2019; 7 years ago
- Operating system: Cross-platform
- License: BSD
- Website: www.haskell.org/platform/
- Repository: github.com/haskell/haskell-platform

The Haskell Platform is a set of software packages, tools, and libraries that create a common platform for using and developing applications in the programming language Haskell. With the Haskell Platform, Haskell follows the same principle as Python: "Batteries included". Since 2022, the Haskell Platform has been deprecated.

== Motivation ==
The quality of a programming language itself is only one component in the ability of application writers to get the job done. Programming languages can succeed or fail based on the breadth and quality of their library collection.

The Haskell Platform aims to unify Haskell development tools into a single package, consisting of a compiler, compiling tools, and many standard libraries, thereby making it easier to develop and deploy full-featured Haskell-based applications.

== Packages included ==
The last versions consist of:

- Glasgow Haskell Compiler (GHC), Haskell's flagship compiler
- The GHC-Profiler
- GHCi, GHCs bytecode-interpreter
- The GHCi-Debugger
- Alex, a lexer generator, similar to Lex
- Happy, a parser generator, similar to Yacc
- Cabal, a package manager
- Haddock, a documentation tool
- hsc2hs, a preprocessor for binding Haskell to C code, allowing C libraries to be used from Haskell
- various libraries, such as zlib, cgi and OpenGL

== Deployment ==
It is available for Ubuntu, Arch Linux, FreeBSD, Gentoo Linux (IA-32, x86-64), Fedora Linux, Debian (stable) and NixOS. One-click installers exist for macOS (Intel) and Windows.

== Versions ==
Originally, in 2009, the Haskell Platform aimed at a periodic 6-month release cycle. Starting with 7.10.2 which was released July 29, 2015, it has followed the release cycle of GHC and has since used the same version numbering scheme.

== Deprecation ==
In 2022, the Haskell Platform was deprecated, and is no longer an actively supported or recommended way of installing Haskell. It has been superseded by GHCup.

== See also ==
- List of Haskell software and tools
