= Lists of programming software development tools =

This is a list of programming software development tools by programming language.

- List of Ada software and tools
- List of assembly software and tools
- List of C++ software and tools
- List of C# software
- List of C software and tools
- List of COBOL software and tools
- List of Fortran software and tools
- List of Go software and tools
- List of Haskell software and tools
- List of Java software and tools and list of Java frameworks
- List of JavaScript libraries and comparison of JavaScript-based web frameworks
- List of Julia software and tools
- List of Kotlin software and tools
- List of Lisp software and tools
- List of Perl software and tools
- List of Python software
- List of PHP software and tools
- List of R software and tools
- List of Ruby software and tools
- List of Rust software and tools
- List of SQL software and tools
- List of Swift software and tools
- List of TypeScript software and tools
- List of Visual Basic .NET software and tools

== See also ==
- List of AI-assisted software development tools
- List of data science software
- List of MATLAB software and tools
- List of NoSQL software and tools
- List of open-source programming software
- List of quantum software
- List of TeX typesetting software and tools
- Web development tools
