= David Roundy =

American physicist

- Born: August 24, 1973 (age 53); United States
- Education: U.C. Berkeley
- Known for: Creator of Darcs
- Scientific career
- Fields: Physics
- Workplaces: Oregon State University

David Roundy is a physicist, known also as the author of the Darcs version control system.

He obtained a B.A. in Physics and Chemistry in 1995 and a Ph.D. in physics from Berkeley in 2001. Between 2001 and 2006 he did postdoctoral work at MIT and Cornell. He was an assistant professor in Physics at Oregon State University from 2006 to 2014, and an associate professor from 2014 to 2022.

== Notable publications ==
- 2002 - The origin of the anomalous superconducting properties of MgB_{2}
- 2010 - Meep: A flexible free-software package for electromagnetic simulations by the FDTD method
- 2004 - A tunable carbon nanotube electromechanical oscillator
