= Snap (web framework) =

Web development framework in Haskell

- Original authors: Gregory Collins, Doug Beardsley
- Developer: Snap Team
- Release: May 2010; 16 years ago
- Stable release: 1.1.3.2 / July 19, 2023; 3 years ago
- Written in: Haskell
- Operating system: Cross-platform: Unix, Unix-like, macOS; Windows NT
- Platform: IA-32, x86-64
- Available in: English
- Type: Web framework
- License: BSD
- Website: snapframework.com
- Repository: github.com/snapframework

Snap is a web framework for developing web applications written in the functional programming language Haskell.

== Overview ==
The Snap framework consists of the following:

- snap-core, a generic Haskell web server API.
- snap-server, a fast HTTP server that implements the snap-core interface.
- Heist, an HTML-based templating system for generating pages that allows you to bind Haskell functionality to HTML tags for a clean separation of view and backend code, much like Lift's snippets. Heist is self-contained and can be used independently.
- Snaplets, a high-level system for building modular web applications.
- Built-in snaplets for templating, session management, and authentication.
- Third party snaplets for features including file uploads, database connectivity (PostgreSQL, MongoDB, etc.), generation of JavaScript from Haskell code, and more.
- The Snap monad for stateful access to HTTP requests and responses.

Snap runs on both Windows NT and Unix-like platforms. Snap uses the Iteratee input/output (I/O) model, As of version 1.0, its I/O is implemented with io-streams.

== Usage ==
Snap is used by Silk, JanRain, Racemetric, Lee Paste's Financial Blog, SooStone Inc, and Group Commerce. Snap is also used as a lightweight, standalone Haskell server. The static site generator Hakyll uses Snap for its preview mode.

== Other Haskell web frameworks ==
- Yesod (web framework)
- Servant (web framework)
- Scotty
- Spock
- MFlow
- Miso
