= John Hughes (computer scientist) =

Swedish computer scientist (born 1958)

R. John M. Hughes
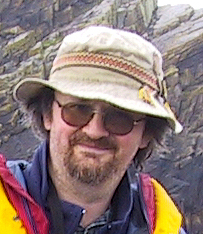
- John Hughes.
- Born: 15 July 1958 (age 68); Sweden
- Education: University of Oxford, DPhil, 1984
- Known for: Functional programming group at Chalmers; Haskell language research QuickCheck; cofounder, CEO of QuviQ "Why Functional Programming Matters"; Software testing
- Spouse: Mary Sheeran
- Awards: Elected ACM Fellow, 2018
- Scientific career
- Fields: Computer science, functional programming
- Workplaces: Chalmers University of Technology, QuviQ
- Thesis: The Design and Implementation of Programming Languages (1984)
- Doctoral advisor: Bernard Sufrin
- Website: www.cse.chalmers.se/~rjmh

R. John M. Hughes (born 15 July 1958) is a computer scientist and professor in the computer science department at Chalmers University of Technology.

== Contributions ==
In 1984, Hughes received his Doctor of Philosophy (PhD) from the University of Oxford for the thesis "The Design and Implementation of Programming Languages".

Hughes undertakes research in the field of programming languages. He is a member of the functional programming group at Chalmers, and has written many research papers on the subject, including "Why Functional Programming Matters". Much of his research relates to the language Haskell.

Hughes is one of the developers of the QuickCheck library, and a cofounder and CEO of QuviQ, which provides QuickCheck software and offers classes on how to use it.

In 2016, he appeared in the popular science YouTube channel Computerphile explaining functional programming and QuickCheck.

== Recognition ==
Hughes was elected as an ACM Fellow in 2018 for "contributions to software testing and functional programming".

== See also ==
- Haskell
- QuickCheck

== Bibliography ==
- J. Hughes. "Generalizing monads to arrows". Science of Computer Programming, (37):67–111, 2000.
