= Stack (Haskell) =

Haskell development tool

stack
- Initial release: June 23, 2015; 9 years ago
- Stable release: 2.7.1 / May 8, 2021; 3 years ago
- Written in: Haskell
- Operating system: Unix, Unix-like, Windows
- Size: 60 megabytes
- Available in: English
- License: BSD
- Website: www.haskellstack.org

Stack is a tool to build projects and manage their dependencies for the programming language Haskell. It uses the Cabal library but with a curated version of the Hackage software repository named Stackage.

Stack competes against Cabal's binary file cabal-install and has been created as a result of the overall criticism about dependency problems. However, it does not provide its own package format, but uses extant *.cabal files and complements projects with an added stack.yaml file.
