= List of COBOL software and tools =

COBOL software and development tools

This is a list of software and programming tools for the COBOL programming language, which includes compilers, IDEs, build tools, testing, frameworks, and related projects.

== Compilers and runtimes ==
- Fujitsu NetCOBOL — COBOL compiler for Windows, Linux, and mainframes
- GCC (gcobol) — open-source COBOL compiler.
- GnuCOBOL — open-source COBOL compiler translating COBOL to C and then compiling with GCC
- IBM COBOL — mainframe COBOL compiler for IBM z/OS and IBM i platforms
- Micro Focus COBOL — commercial COBOL compiler and runtime for enterprise systems
- FairCom RTG – A commercial real-time database and runtime solution developed by FairCom Corporation. It provides integration with COBOL applications for transaction processing and modernization projects, and is used in enterprise environments requiring high-performance data management.

== Integrated development environments ==
- Eclipse IDE — with COBOL plugin support, Micro Focus or Bitlang extensions.
- IBM Developer for z/OS — IDE for COBOL and PL/I mainframe development
- Micro Focus Visual COBOL — IDE integration for Visual Studio, Visual Studio Code, and Eclipse
- OpenCOBOLIDE — open-source lightweight IDE for GnuCOBOL
- Visual Studio Code — with COBOL extensions via Bitlang COBOL and GnuCOBOL Language Server

== Frameworks, libraries, and APIs ==
- ACUCOBOL-GT — runtime and API library suite from Micro Focus
- CICS — IBM middleware for transaction processing in COBOL applications
- DB2 and IMS APIs — database access libraries commonly used with COBOL applications

== Build tools and package managers ==
- Apache Ant — scripting and build automation for COBOL/Java hybrid systems
- GNU Make — common build tool for compiling COBOL via GnuCOBOL
- Jenkins — used for CI/CD automation with COBOL builds

== Testing and quality assurance ==
- COBOL Check — open-source unit testing framework for COBOL
- IBM Rational Performance Tester — automated performance testing of web and server-based applications from the Rational Software division of IBM
- Micro Focus Unit Testing Framework — integrated COBOL unit testing tool

== Debugging and profiling tools ==
- GDB-COBOL — Source-Level Debugging for COBOL Developers
- GnuCOBOL debug mode — command-line debugging integrated in GnuCOBOL compiler
- IBM Debug Tool for z/OS — mainframe debugging for COBOL and PL/I
- Micro Focus Animator — step-through debugger for COBOL code

== See also ==
- Legacy system
- Lists of programming software development tools by language
- Mainframe computer
