= Philip Wadler =

American computer scientist

Phil Wadler FRS FRSE
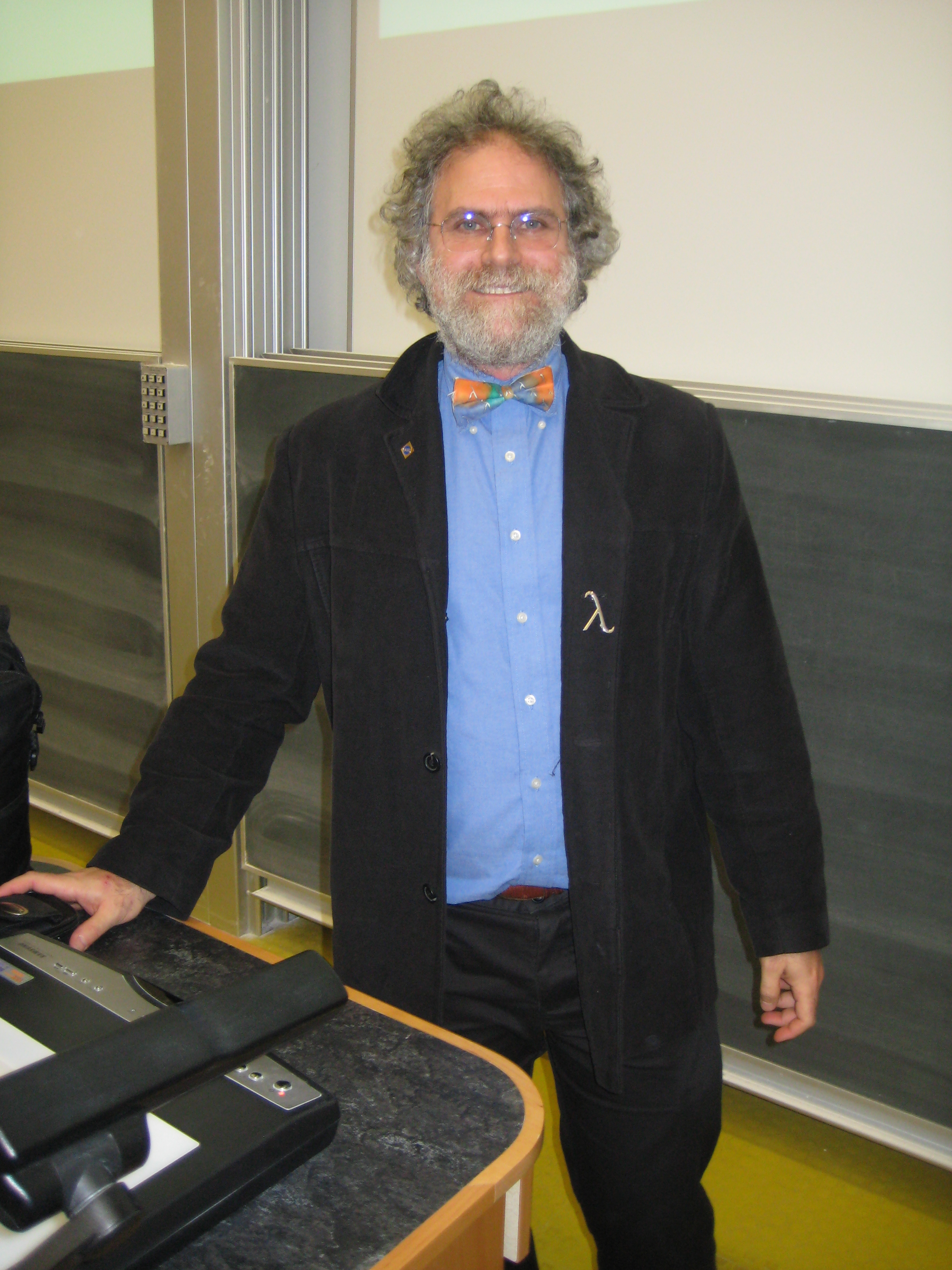
- Wadler before a lecture at the University of Edinburgh
- Born: Philip Lee Wadler; April 8, 1956 (age 70)
- Citizenship: American
- Education: Stanford University (BSc); Carnegie Mellon University (PhD)
- Known for: Theory of functional programming, monads; Contributions to languages: Haskell, XQuery; Created language Orwell; Helped add generic types to Java 5; Wrote "Theorems for free!"
- Awards: Fellow of the Royal Society of Edinburgh (2005); ACM Fellow (2007); ACM Distinguished Service Award (2016); Fellow of the Royal Society (2023)
- Scientific career
- Fields: Computer science, programming languages
- Workplaces: University of Edinburgh; Avaya Labs; Bell Labs; University of Glasgow; University of Sydney; University of Copenhagen; University of Oxford; Chalmers University of Technology; Carnegie Mellon University; Stanford University
- Thesis: Listlessness is Better than Laziness: An Algorithm that Transforms Applicative Programs to Eliminate Intermediate Lists (1984)
- Doctoral advisor: Nico Habermann
- Website: homepages.inf.ed.ac.uk/wadler/

Philip Lee Wadler (born April 8, 1956) is a UK-based American computer scientist known for his contributions to programming language design and type theory. He holds the position of Personal Chair of theoretical computer science at the Laboratory for Foundations of Computer Science at the School of Informatics, University of Edinburgh. He has contributed to the theory behind functional programming and the use of monads; and the designs of the purely functional language Haskell and the XQuery declarative query language. In 1984, he created the Orwell language. Wadler was involved in adding generic types to Java 5.0. He is also author of "Theorems for free!", a paper that gave rise to much research on functional language optimization (see also Parametricity).

== Education ==
Wadler received a Bachelor of Science degree in mathematics from Stanford University in 1977, and a Master of Science degree in computer science from Carnegie Mellon University in 1979. He completed his Doctor of Philosophy in computer science at Carnegie Mellon University in 1984. His thesis was entitled "Listlessness is better than laziness" and was supervised by Nico Habermann.

== Research and career ==
Wadler's research interests are in programming languages.

Wadler was a research fellow at the Programming Research Group (part of the Oxford University Computing Laboratory) and St Cross College, Oxford during 1983–87. He was progressively lecturer, reader, and professor at the University of Glasgow from 1987 to 1996. Wadler was a member of technical staff at Bell Labs, Lucent Technologies (1996–99) and then at Avaya Labs (1999–2003). Since 2003, he has been professor of theoretical computer science in the School of Informatics at the University of Edinburgh.

Wadler was editor of the Journal of Functional Programming from 1990 to 2004.

Since 2003, Wadler has been a professor of theoretical computer science at the Laboratory for Foundations of Computer Science at the University of Edinburgh and is the chair of theoretical computer science. In 2006, he was working on a new functional language for writing web applications, called Links. He has supervised many doctoral students to completion. He is also a member of the university's Blockchain Technology Laboratory. Wadler has a h-index of 72 with 26,864 citations at Google Scholar.

Since 2018 Wadler has also been a senior research fellow and area leader for programming languages at IOHK (now Input Output Global), the blockchain engineering company developing Cardano. He has contributed to work on Plutus, a Turing-complete smart contract language for Cardano written in Haskell; the UTXO ledger system, native tokens, and System F in Agda.

=== Awards and honours ===
In 2003, Wadler was given the award for the most influential paper from ten years earlier by the Symposium on Principles of Programming Languages. The award cited "Imperative functional programming", a paper written jointly with Simon Peyton Jones in 1993. In 2005, he was elected Fellow of the Royal Society of Edinburgh (FRSE). In 2007, he was inducted as a fellow by the Association for Computing Machinery. He was elected Fellow of the Royal Society (FRS) in 2023.
