= Orwell (programming language) =

Functional programming language

- Paradigm: Lazy, functional
- Designed by: Philip Wadler
- Developer: Martin Raskovsky
- First appeared: 1984; 42 years ago
- Stable release: 6.00 / January 1990; 36 years ago
- OS: Unix

Influenced by
- Miranda

Influenced
- Haskell

Orwell is a small, lazy evaluation, functional programming language implemented principally by Martin Raskovsky and first released in 1984 by Philip Wadler during his time as a Research Fellow in the Programming Research Group, part of the Oxford University Computing Laboratory. Developed as a free alternative to Miranda, it was a forerunner of Haskell and was one of the first programming languages to support list comprehensions and pattern matching.

The name is a tribute to George Orwell's novel Nineteen Eighty-Four, the year in which the language was released. In the late 1980s and the 1990s, most of the computing practical assignments for undergraduates studying for a degree in Mathematics and Computation at Oxford University were required to be completed using the language.
