= Science of Computer Programming =

- Discipline: Computer science
- Language: English
- Edited by: M.R. Mousavi, A. De Lucia

Publication details
- History: 1981–present
- Publisher: Elsevier
- Open access: Hybrid
- Impact factor: 0.863 (2020)

Standard abbreviations
- ISO 4: Sci. Comput. Program.

Indexing
- ISSN: 0167-6423
- LCCN: 83642618
- OCLC no.: 888515763

Links
- Journal homepage; Online archive

Science of Computer Programming is a peer-reviewed scientific journal covering computer programming. It is published by Elsevier and the editors-in-chief are M.R. Mousavi (King's College London) and A. De Lucia (University of Salerno). The journal was established in 1981.

== Abstracting and indexing ==
The journal is abstracted and indexed in:

- Current Contents/Engineering, Computing & Technology
- EBSCO databases
- Inspec
- Science Citation Index Expanded
- Scopus
- Zentralblatt MATH

According to the Journal Citation Reports, the journal has a 2020 impact factor of 0.863.
