= Cryptol =

Programming language for cryptography

- Developer: Galois, Inc.
- First appeared: 1980; 45 years ago
- Stable release: 3.2.0 / August 20, 2024; 7 months ago
- Implementation language: Haskell, Python
- Platform: AArch64, x86-64
- OS: Linux, macOS, Windows
- License: BSD 3-clause
- Website: www.cryptol.net

Cryptol is a domain-specific programming language for cryptography developed by the Portland, Oregon based software development firm, Galois, Inc. It is free and open-source software released under a BSD 3-clause software license.

The language was originally developed for use by the United States National Security Agency. The language is also used by private firms that provide information technology systems, such as the American company Rockwell Collins provides to aerospace and defense contractors in the United States.

The programming language is used for all aspects of developing and using cryptography, such as the design and implementation of new ciphers and the verification of existing cryptographic algorithms. Cryptol is designed to allow a cryptographer to watch how stream processing functions in the program manipulate ciphers or encryption algorithms.
