= ALF (proof assistant) =

Structure editor for monomorphic Martin-Löf type theory

ALF ("Another logical framework") is a structure editor for monomorphic Martin-Löf type theory developed at Chalmers University. It is a predecessor of the Alfa, Agda and Cayenne proof assistants and dependently typed programming languages. It was the first language to support inductive families and dependent pattern matching.
