= NoRedInk =

Language-learning platform

- Company type: Private
- Website type: Educational website
- Available in: English
- Headquarters: San Francisco, California
- Website: noredink.com
- Launched: 2012
- Current status: Active

NoRedInk (stylised as noredink) is an online web-based writing education platform.

== History ==
NoRedInk was founded by Jeff Scheur, a high school English teacher at Whitney Young Magnet High School in Chicago. During his tenure of 8 years, Scheur often saw that students were not able to properly understand the mistakes they had made on written assignments. As a result, he built a taxonomy of commonly spotted errors, accumulating several years of information. In his 8th year of education, Scheur posted an advertisement on Craigslist asking for an engineer to help him build an educational platform. Scheur's students voted on the name "NoRedInk."

In February 2012, Scheur shared the first version of NoRedInk with some colleagues at an Illinois conference. The application grew to 15,000 users in its first two months. In September 2012, NoRedInk won the Citi Innovation Challenge, hosted by NBC, netting the company $75,000 in prize money. In January 2013, NoRedInk raised $2 million from a series of investors, including Google Ventures.

In 2021, NoRedInk raised $50 million in a series B fundraiser.

NoRedInk includes interest options so students can have familiar people or characters appear in the questions.
