= Hugs (interpreter) =

Haskell compiler

Hugs 98
- Developer(s): Mark P. Jones, others
- Final release: September 2006 / September 21, 2006; 18 years ago
- Written in: Haskell
- Operating system: Cross-platform
- Predecessor: Gofer
- Type: Compiler
- License: BSD
- Website: www.haskell.org/hugs

Hugs (Haskell User's Gofer System), also Hugs 98, is a bytecode interpreter for the functional programming language Haskell. Hugs is the successor to Gofer, and was originally derived from Gofer version 2.30b. Hugs and Gofer were originally developed by Mark P. Jones, now a professor at Portland State University.

Hugs comes with a simple graphics library. As a complete Haskell implementation that is portable and simple to install, Hugs is sometimes recommended for new Haskell users.

Hugs deviates from the Haskell 98 specification in several minor ways. For example, Hugs does not support mutually recursive modules. A list of differences exists.

The Hugs prompt is a Haskell read–eval–print loop (REPL). It accepts expressions for evaluation, but not module, type, or function definitions. Hugs can load Haskell modules at start-up.

== Examples ==
=== Extensible records ===
An example of "typed records with extensibility", a non-standard feature unique to Hugs.

module Main where

import Hugs.Trex

type Coord = Double
type Point2D = Rec (x::Coord, y::Coord) 
type Point3D = Rec (x::Coord, y::Coord, z::Coord)

point2D = (x=1, y=1) :: Point2D

-- emptyRec :: Rec EmptyRow  -- predefined

-- (x=1 | (y=1))   -- rec. extension
-- (x=v | rec)     -- record value decomposition, pattern fields must be non empty
-- (x::type | rec)   -- record type decomposition

-- (rec\z) in the context means ''rec'' does not contain field ''z''

-- add a field z with the same type as field x
addZCoord :: (r\z, r\x) => t -> Rec ( x::t | r) -> Rec ( x::t, z::t | r)
addZCoord z ( x = x | other) = (x = x, z = z | other)

point3D = addZCoord 3 point2D   -- :: Point3D

-- admit any record with ''showable'' fields x and y 
printXY :: (Show t, r\x, r\y) => Rec (x::t, y::t | r) -> IO ()
printXY point = putStrLn xy
  -- with SML style field accessors ('#' prefix)
  where xy = show (#x point) ++", "++ show (#y point)

incrementX :: (Num t, r\x) => Rec (x::t | r) -> Rec (x::t | r)
incrementX  (x=v | rest) = (x=v+1 | rest)

main = do
  let point3D' = incrementX point3D
  printXY point2D
  printXY point3D'

Running with H98 compatibility turned off to activate language extensions:

runhugs -98 test.hs
