= Universal type =

In type theory universal type(s) may refer to:

- The top type in a type system with subtyping.
- Universal types is a shorthand for universally quantified types in systems that support parametric polymorphism like System F.
