= System U =

Special forms of a typed lambda calculus

In mathematical logic, System U and System U^{−} are pure type systems, i.e. special forms of a typed lambda calculus with an arbitrary number of sorts, axioms and rules (or dependencies between the sorts).

System U was proved inconsistent by Jean-Yves Girard in 1972 (and the question of consistency of System U^{−} was formulated). This result led to the realization that Martin-Löf's original 1971 type theory was inconsistent, as it allowed the same "type in type" behaviour that Girard's paradox exploits.

== Formal definition ==
System U is defined as a pure type system with

- three sorts $\{\ast, \square, \triangle\}$;
- two axioms $\{\ast:\square, \square:\triangle\}$; and
- five rules $\{(\ast,\ast), (\square,\ast), (\square,\square), (\triangle,\ast), (\triangle,\square)\}$.

System U^{−} is defined the same with the exception of the $(\triangle, \ast)$ rule.

The sorts $\ast$ and $\square$ are conventionally called “type” and “kind”, respectively; the sort $\triangle$ doesn't have a specific name. The two axioms describe the containment of types in kinds ($\ast:\square$) and kinds in $\triangle$ ($\square:\triangle$). Intuitively, the sorts describe a hierarchy in the nature of the terms.

1. All values have a type, such as a base type (e.g. $b : \mathrm{Bool}$ is read as “$b$ is a boolean”) or a (dependent) function type (e.g. $f : \mathrm{Nat} \to \mathrm{Bool}$ is read as “$f$ is a function from natural numbers to booleans”).
2. $\ast$ is the sort of all such types ($t : \ast$ is read as “$t$ is a type”). From $\ast$ we can build more terms, such as $\ast \to \ast$ which is the kind of unary type-level operators (e.g. $\mathrm{List} : \ast \to \ast$ is read as “$\mathrm{List}$ is a function from types to types”, that is, a polymorphic type). The rules restrict how we can form new kinds.
3. $\square$ is the sort of all such kinds ($k : \square$ is read as “$k$ is a kind”). Similarly we can build related terms, according to what the rules allow.
4. $\triangle$ is the sort of all such terms.

The rules govern the dependencies between the sorts: $(\ast,\ast)$ says that values may depend on values (functions), $(\square,\ast)$ allows values to depend on types (polymorphism), $(\square,\square)$ allows types to depend on types (type operators), and so on.

== Girard's paradox ==
The definitions of System U and U^{−} allow the assignment of polymorphic kinds to generic constructors in analogy to polymorphic types of terms in classical polymorphic lambda calculi, such as System F. An example of such a generic constructor might be (where k denotes a kind variable)

$$\lambda k^\square \lambda\alpha^{k \to k} \lambda\beta^k\!. \alpha (\alpha \beta) \;:\; \Pi k : \square.((k \to k) \to k \to k)$$.

This mechanism is sufficient to construct a term with the type $(\forall p:\ast, p)$ (equivalent to the type $\bot$), which implies that every type is inhabited. By the Curry–Howard correspondence, this is equivalent to all logical propositions being provable, which makes the system inconsistent.

Girard's paradox is the type-theoretic analogue of the Burali-Forti paradox in set theory.
