= HKT =

HKT may refer to:

- German Eastern Marches Society, (Hakata or H-K-T), a German organisation 1894–1934
- Helsingin Kisa-Toverit, a Finnish sport club
- Hong Kong Telecom
- Hong Kong Tramways
- Hong Kong Time
- The Hong Kong Times, a former newspaper
- Höckmayr KFZ-Technik, Lotus Seven clone manufacturer
- Phuket International Airport, in Thailand
- Higher-kinded type
