= Convergence (logic) =

In mathematics, computer science and logic, convergence is the idea that different sequences of transformations come to a conclusion in a finite amount of time (the transformations are terminating), and that the conclusion reached is independent of the path taken to get to it (they are confluent).

More formally, a preordered set of term rewriting transformations are said to be convergent if they are confluent and terminating.

== See also ==
- Logical equality
- Logical equivalence
- Rule of replacement
