= Second-order propositional logic =

Type of propositional logic

A second-order propositional logic is a propositional logic extended with quantification over propositions. A special case are the logics that allow second-order Boolean propositions, where quantifiers may range either just over the Boolean truth values, or over the Boolean-valued truth functions.

The most widely known formalism is the intuitionistic logic with impredicative quantification, System F. Parigot (1997) showed how this calculus can be extended to admit classical logic.

== See also ==
- True quantified Boolean formula
- Second-order arithmetic
- Second-order logic
- Type theory
