= Henk Barendregt =

Dutch logician (born 1947)

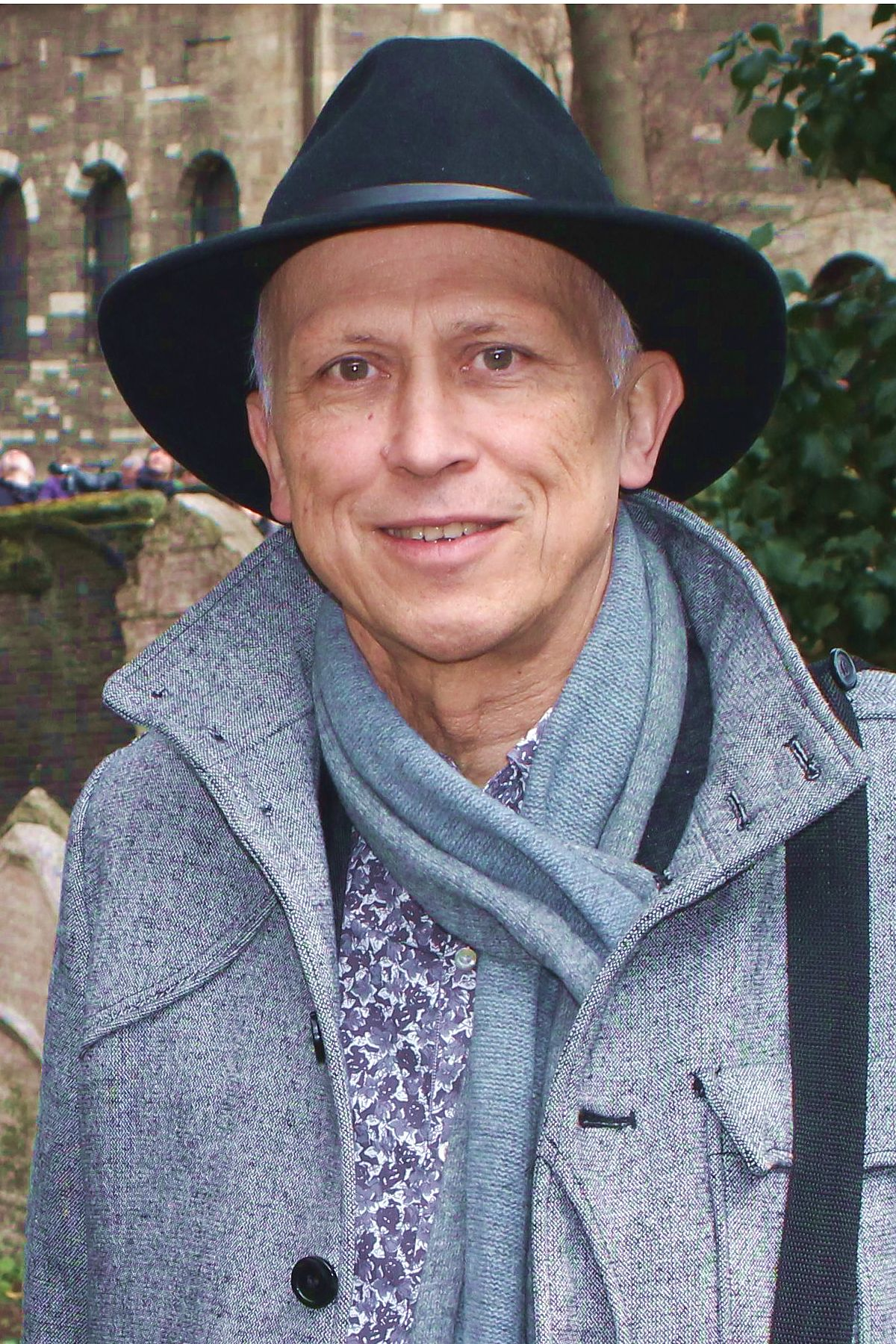
Henk Barendregt during his visit in Prague in April 2012

Hendrik Pieter (Henk) Barendregt (born 18 December 1947, Amsterdam) is a Dutch logician, known for his work in lambda calculus and type theory.

== Life and work ==
Barendregt studied mathematical logic at Utrecht University, obtaining his master's degree in 1968 and his PhD in 1971, both cum laude, under Dirk van Dalen and Georg Kreisel. After a postdoctoral position at Stanford University, he taught at Utrecht University.

Since 1986, Barendregt has taught at Radboud University Nijmegen, where he now holds the Chair of Foundations of Mathematics and Computer Science. His research group works on Constructive Interactive Mathematics. He is also adjunct professor at Carnegie Mellon University, Pittsburgh, US. He has been a visiting scholar at Darmstadt, ETH Zürich, Siena, and Kyoto.

Barendregt was elected a member of Academia Europaea in 1992. In 1997 Barendregt was elected member of the Royal Netherlands Academy of Arts and Sciences. On 6 February 2003 Barendregt was awarded the Spinozapremie for 2002, the highest scientific award in the Netherlands. In 2002 he was knighted in the Orde van de Nederlandse Leeuw.

Barendregt received an honorary doctorate from Heriot-Watt University in 2015.

== Selected publications ==
- H.P. Barendregt (1984). The Lambda Calculus — Its Syntax and Semantics. Studies in Logic and the Foundations of Mathematics. Vol. 103. Amsterdam: North-Holland. ISBN 0-444-87508-5. — See Errata
- Y. Toyama; J.W. Klop; H.P. Barendregt (1989). "Termination for the Direct Sum of left-Linear Term Rewriting Systems (Preliminary Draft)". In Nachum Dershowitz (ed.). Rewriting Techniques and Applications, 3rd Int. Conf., RTA-89. LNCS. Vol. 355. Springer. pp. 477–491.
- H.P. Barendregt (2001). "Computing and Proving (invited lecture)". In Middeldorp, A. (ed.). Rewriting Techniques and Applications, 12th Int. Conf., RTA-01. LNCS. Vol. 2051. Springer.
- H.P. Barendregt, W. Dekkers and R. Statman (2013). Lambda Calculus with Types. Perspectives in Logic. Cambridge University Press. ISBN 978-052-176-614-2.
- H.P. Barendregt and G. Manzonetto (2022). A Lambda Calculus Satellite. Mathematical Logic and Foundations. College Publications. ISBN 978-1-84890-415-6.
