= STLC =

STLC may refer to:

- Simply typed lambda calculus
- Software testing life cycle (disambiguation)
- The St. Louis Cardinals, a professional baseball team based in St. Louis, Missouri
- Space-time line codes
