= Richard Statman =

American computer scientist (born 1946)

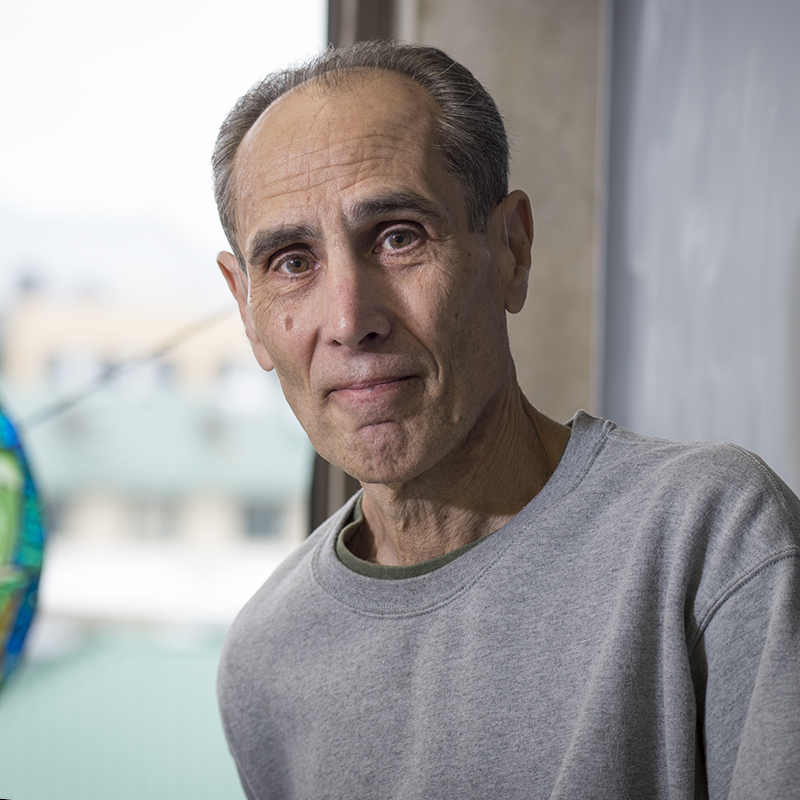
- Born: September 6, 1946 (age 79)
- Education: Stanford University
- Scientific career
- Fields: computer science
- Workplaces: Carnegie Mellon
- Doctoral advisor: Georg Kreisel

Richard Statman (born September 6, 1946) is an American computer scientist whose principal research interest is the theory of computation, especially symbolic computation. His research involves lambda calculus, type theory, and combinatory algebra.

== Career ==
In 1974, Statman received his Ph.D. from Stanford University for his Ph.D. dissertation, supervised by Georg Kreisel, entitled Structural Complexity of Proofs. His achievements include the proof that the type inhabitation problem in simply typed lambda calculus is PSPACE-complete, lower bounds on simply typed lambda calculus, logical relations, and intersection types. He was a co-author of the book Lambda Calculus with Types.
