= Type inhabitation =

In type theory, a branch of mathematical logic, in a given typed calculus, the type inhabitation problem for this calculus is the following problem: given a type $\tau$ and a typing environment $\Gamma$, does there exist a $\lambda$-term M such that $\Gamma \vdash M : \tau$? With an empty type environment, such an M is said to be an inhabitant of $\tau$.

== Relationship to logic ==
In the case of simply typed lambda calculus, a type has an inhabitant if and only if its corresponding proposition is a tautology of minimal implicative logic. Similarly, a System F type has an inhabitant if and only if its corresponding proposition is a tautology of intuitionistic second-order logic.

Girard's paradox shows that type inhabitation is strongly related to the consistency of a type system with Curry–Howard correspondence. To be sound, such a system must have uninhabited types.

== Formal properties ==
For most typed calculi, the type inhabitation problem is very hard. Richard Statman proved that for simply typed lambda calculus the type inhabitation problem is PSPACE-complete. For other calculi, like System F, the problem is even undecidable.

== See also ==
- Curry–Howard isomorphism
