= Osem =

Osem may refer to:

- Osem (mathematics) – algorithm for image reconstruction in nuclear medical imaging
- Osem (company) – Israeli food corporation
- Orquesta Sinfonica del Estado de Mexico, an official State symphony orchestra in Mexico.
