= Per Martin-Löf =

Swedish logician, philosopher, and mathematical statistician

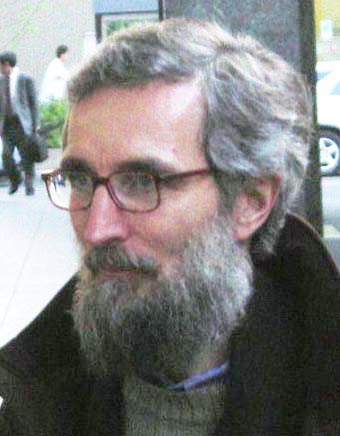
- Per Martin-Löf in 2004
- Born: 8 May 1942 (age 84); Stockholm, Sweden
- Citizenship: Sweden
- Education: Stockholm University
- Known for: Random sequences Exact tests Repetitive structure Sufficient statistics expectation–maximization (EM) method Martin-Löf type theory Martin-Löf randomness
- Awards: Royal Swedish Academy of Sciences (1990); Gödel Lecture (2006); Rolf Schock Prize (2020)
- Scientific career
- Fields: Computer Science; Logic; Mathematical statistics Philosophy
- Workplaces: Stockholm University; University of Chicago; Aarhus University
- Doctoral advisor: Andrei N. Kolmogorov

Per Erik Rutger Martin-Löf (/lɒf/; Swedish: [ˈmǎʈːɪn ˈløːv]; born 8 May 1942) is a Swedish logician, philosopher, and mathematical statistician. He is internationally renowned for his work on the foundations of probability, statistics, mathematical logic, and computer science. Since the late 1970s, Martin-Löf's publications have been mainly in logic. In philosophical logic, Martin-Löf has wrestled with the philosophy of logical consequence and judgment, partly inspired by the work of Brentano, Frege, and Husserl. In mathematical logic, Martin-Löf has been active in developing intuitionistic type theory as a constructive foundation of mathematics; Martin-Löf's work on type theory has influenced computer science.

Until his retirement in 2009, Per Martin-Löf held a joint chair for Mathematics and Philosophy at Stockholm University.

His brother Anders Martin-Löf was emeritus professor of mathematical statistics at Stockholm University; the two brothers have collaborated in research in probability and statistics. The research of Anders and Per Martin-Löf has influenced statistical theory, especially concerning exponential families, the expectation–maximization method for missing data, and model selection.

Per Martin-Löf received his PhD in 1970 from Stockholm University, under Andrey Kolmogorov.

Martin-Löf is an enthusiastic bird-watcher; his first scientific publication was on the mortality rates of ringed birds.

== Randomness and Kolmogorov complexity ==
In 1964 and 1965, Martin-Löf studied in Moscow under the supervision of Andrei N. Kolmogorov. He wrote a 1966 article The definition of random sequences that gave the first suitable definition of a random sequence.

Earlier researchers such as Richard von Mises had attempted to formalize the notion of a test for randomness in order to define a random sequence as one that passed all tests for randomness; however, the precise notion of a randomness test was left vague. Martin-Löf's key insight was to use the theory of computation to define formally the notion of a test for randomness. This contrasts with the idea of randomness in probability; in that theory, no particular element of a sample space can be said to be random.

Martin-Löf randomness has since been shown to admit many equivalent characterizations — in terms of compression, randomness tests, and gambling — that bear little outward resemblance to the original definition, but each of which satisfies our intuitive notion of properties that random sequences ought to have: random sequences should be incompressible, they should pass statistical tests for randomness, and it should be impossible to make money betting on them. The existence of these multiple definitions of Martin-Löf randomness, and the stability of these definitions under different models of computation, give evidence that Martin-Löf randomness is a fundamental property of mathematics and not an accident of Martin-Löf's particular model. The thesis that the definition of Martin-Löf randomness "correctly" captures the intuitive notion of randomness has been called the "Martin-Löf–Chaitin Thesis"; it is somewhat similar to the Church–Turing thesis.

Following Martin-Löf's work, algorithmic information theory defines a random string as one that cannot be produced from any computer program that is shorter than the string (Chaitin–Kolmogorov randomness); i.e. a string whose Kolmogorov complexity is at least the length of the string. This is a different meaning from the usage of the term in statistics. Whereas statistical randomness refers to the process that produces the string (e.g. flipping a coin to produce each bit will randomly produce a string), algorithmic randomness refers to the string itself. Algorithmic information theory separates random from nonrandom strings in a way that is relatively invariant to the model of computation being used.

An algorithmically random sequence is an infinite sequence of characters, all of whose prefixes (except possibly a finite number of exceptions) are strings that are "close to" algorithmically random (their length is within a constant of their Kolmogorov complexity).

== Mathematical statistics ==
Per Martin-Löf has done important research in mathematical statistics, which (in the Swedish tradition) includes probability theory and statistics.

=== Bird-watching and sex determination ===
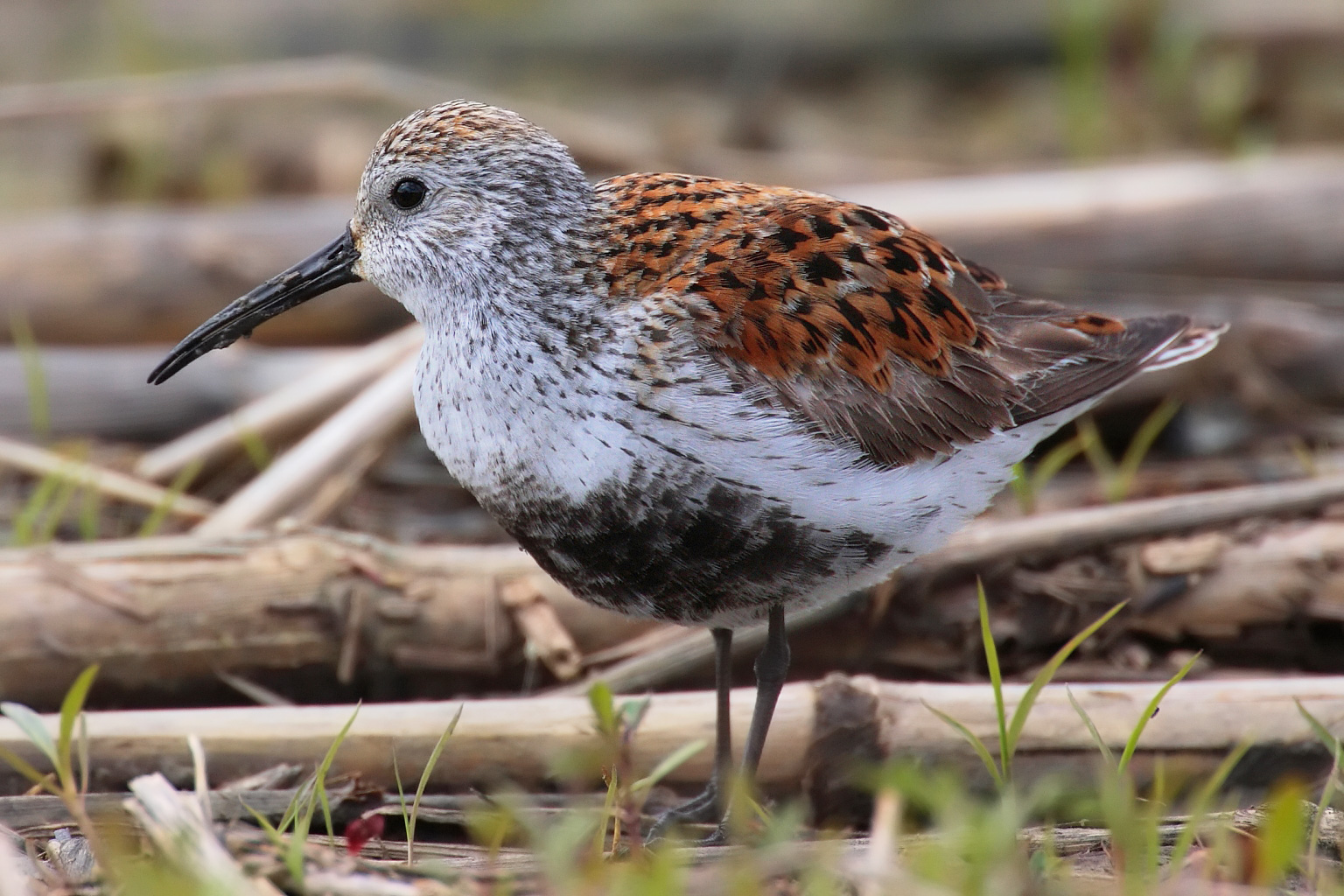
The Dunlin (Calidris alpina)

Per Martin-Löf began bird watching in his youth and remains an enthusiastic bird-watcher. As a teenager, he published an article on estimating the mortality rates of birds, using data from bird ringing, in a Swedish zoological journal: This paper was soon cited in leading international journals, and this paper continues to be cited.

In the biology and statistics of birds, there are several problems of missing data. Martin-Löf's first paper discussed the problem of estimating the mortality rates of the Dunlin species, using capture-recapture methods. The problem of determining the sex of a bird, which, for some species, is extremely difficult for humans, is one of the first examples in Martin-Löf's lectures on statistical models.

=== Probability on algebraic structures ===
Martin-Löf wrote a licenciate thesis on probability on algebraic structures, particularly semigroups, while a student of Ulf Grenander at Stockholm University.

=== Statistical models ===
Martin-Löf developed innovative approaches to statistical theory. In his paper "On Tables of Random Numbers", Kolmogorov observed that the frequency probability notion of the limiting properties of infinite sequences failed to provide a foundation for statistics, which considers only finite samples. Much of Martin-Löf's work in statistics was to provide a finite-sample foundation for statistics.

==== Model selection and hypothesis testing ====
The steps of the EM algorithm on a two component Gaussian mixture model on the Old Faithful dataset

In the 1970s, Per Martin-Löf made important contributions to statistical theory and inspired further research, especially by Scandinavian statisticians including Rolf Sundberg, Thomas Höglund, and Steffan Lauritzen. In this work, Martin-Löf's previous research on probability measures on semigroups led to a notion of "repetitive structure" and a novel treatment of sufficient statistics, which one-parameter exponential families were characterized. He provided a category-theoretic approach to nested statistical models, using finite-sample principles. Before (and after) Martin-Löf, such nested models have often been tested using chi-square hypothesis tests, whose justifications are only asymptotic (and so irrelevant to real problems, which always have finite samples).

==== Expectation–maximization method for exponential families ====
Martin-Löf's student, Rolf Sundberg, developed a detailed analysis of the expectation–maximization (EM) method for estimation using data from exponential families, especially with missing data. Sundberg credits a formula, later known as the Sundberg formula, to previous manuscripts of the Martin-Löf brothers, Per and Anders. Many of these results reached the international scientific community through the 1976 paper on the expectation–maximization (EM) method by Arthur P. Dempster, Nan Laird, and Donald Rubin, which was published in a leading international journal, sponsored by the Royal Statistical Society.

== Logic ==
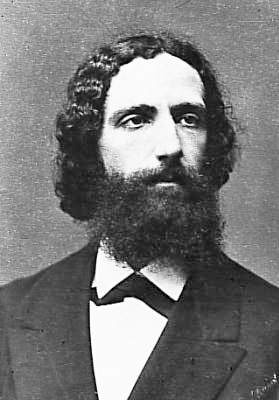
Franz Brentano

=== Philosophical logic ===
In philosophical logic, Per Martin-Löf has published papers on the theory of logical consequence, on judgments, etc. He has been interested in Central-European philosophical traditions, especially of the German-language writings of Franz Brentano, Gottlob Frege, and of Edmund Husserl.

=== Type theory ===
Martin-Löf has worked in mathematical logic for many decades.

From 1968 to '69 he worked as an assistant professor at the University of Chicago where he met William Alvin Howard with whom he discussed issues related to the Curry–Howard correspondence. Martin-Löf's first draft article on type theory dates back to 1971. This impredicative theory generalized Girard's System F. However, this system turned out to be inconsistent due to Girard's paradox which was discovered by Girard when studying System U, an inconsistent extension of System F. This experience led Per Martin-Löf to develop the philosophical foundations of type theory, his meaning explanation, a form of proof-theoretic semantics, which justifies predicative type theory as presented in his 1984 Bibliopolis book, and extended in a number of increasingly philosophical texts, such as his influential On the Meanings of the Logical Constants and the Justifications of the Logical Laws.

The 1984 type theory was extensional while the type theory presented in the book by Nordström et al. in 1990, which was heavily influenced by his later ideas, intensional, and more amenable to being implemented on a computer.

Martin-Löf's intuitionistic type theory developed the notion of dependent types and directly influenced the development of the calculus of constructions and the logical framework LF. A number of popular computer-based proof systems are based on type theory, for example NuPRL, LEGO, Rocq, Lean, ALF, Agda, Twelf, Epigram, and Idris.

== Awards ==
Martin-Löf is a member of the Royal Swedish Academy of Sciences (elected 1990) and of the Academia Europaea (elected 1989).

== See also ==
- Franz Brentano
- Rudolf Carnap
- Michael Dummett
- Gottlob Frege
- Ulf Grenander
- Jaakko Hintikka
- Edmund Husserl
- Andrei N. Kolmogorov
- Anders Martin-Löf
- John von Neumann
- Peter Pagin
- Dag Prawitz
- Charles Sanders Peirce
- Frank P. Ramsey
- Bertrand Russell
- Dana Scott
- Alfred Tarski
- Alan Turing
