= William Alvin Howard =

American mathematician (1926–2026)

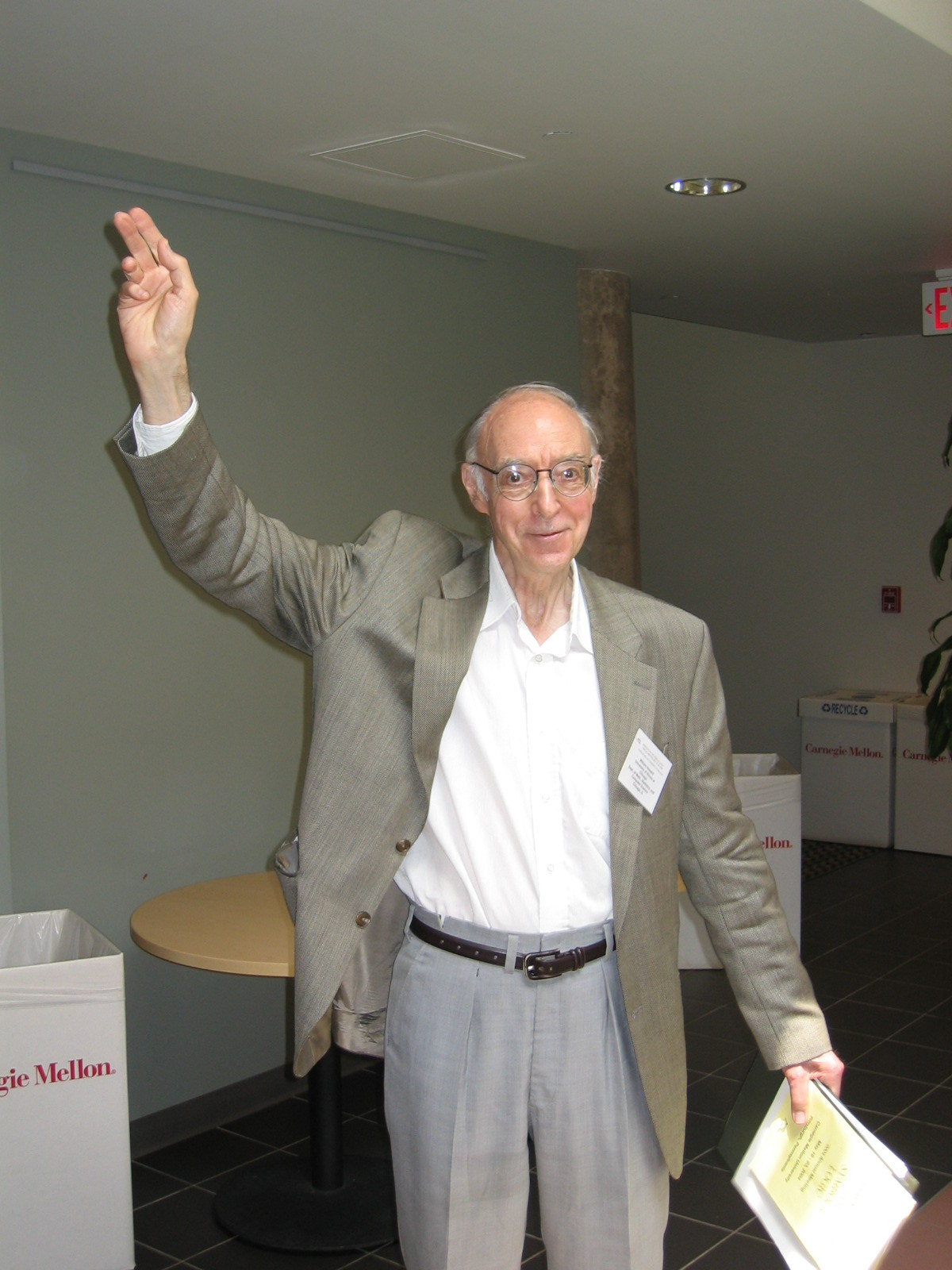
Howard in 2004

William Alvin Howard (December 11, 1926 – March 13, 2026) was a Canadian-born American mathematician and proof theorist best known for his work demonstrating formal similarity between intuitionistic logic and the simply typed lambda calculus that has come to be known as the Curry–Howard correspondence. He was also active in the theory of proof-theoretic ordinals.

== Life and career ==
William Alvin Howard was born in Vancouver, British Columbia, Canada on December 11, 1926. He received an undergraduate degree from the University of British Columbia and later received a master’s degree from the University of Illinois.

Howard earned his Ph.D. at the University of Chicago in 1956 for his dissertation "k-fold recursion and well-ordering". He was a student of Saunders Mac Lane.

The Howard ordinal (also known as the Bachmann–Howard ordinal) was named after him.

Howard was the first to carry out an ordinal analysis of the intuitionistic theory $\mathbf{ID}^i_1(\mathcal O)$ of inductive definitions.^{p.27}

He was elected to the 2018 class of fellows of the American Mathematical Society.

Howard died in Chicago on March 13, 2026, at the age of 99.
