= Message passing (disambiguation) =

Message passing is a mechanism for inter-process communication.

Message passing may also refer to:

- Variational message passing
- Message passing in computer clusters
