= Anders Martin-Löf =

Swedish physicist and mathematician (born 1940)

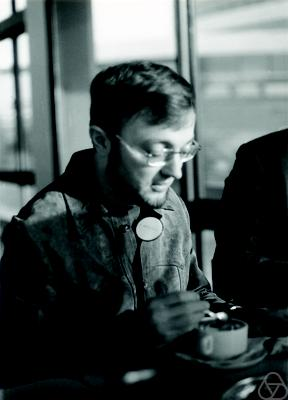
Anders Martin-Löf

Anders Martin-Löf (16 March 1940 – c. 3 March 2026) was a Swedish physicist and mathematician. He has been a professor in insurance mathematics and mathematical statistics since 1987 at the Department of Mathematics of Stockholm University.

Martin-Löf did his undergraduate studies at the KTH Royal Institute of Technology in Stockholm and got his exam in engineering physics in 1963. He continued with graduate studies in optimization at KTH and at MIT in the United States from 1967–1968, later on followed by a position as Research Associate at the Rockefeller University in New York City 1970–1971, working with probability theory and applications to statistical mechanics. Back at KTH in Stockholm he received his Ph.D. degree in 1973.

During the following 10 years he continued working with similar issues as "docent" in Uppsala and Stockholm. In the 1980s, he changed to insurance mathematics with the Folksam company including development of theories for controlling movements of insurances. From 1987 he has been working with theoretical and applied aspects of his assignment as professor with the Stockholm University.

Martin-Löf had two children from his first marriage and a daughter from his second. Anders was the brother of Per Martin-Löf, who was responsible for a pioneering definition of randomness, as well as a foundation for constructive mathematics based on intuitionistic type theory. Per is also a professor at Stockholm University, with joint appointments in the departments of mathematics and philosophy. They share an interest in statistics, and in statistical mechanics, though Per has been more interested in the foundations of statistics, while Anders has been more interested in financial mathematics. Their elder brother Johan is also an engineering physicist, but more inclined to space technology.

Martin-Löf was a fellow student at KTH with Olav Kallenberg.
