= Typing environment =

Construction in type theory

In type theory, a typing environment (or typing context) represents the association between variable names and data types.

More formally, an environment $\Gamma$ is a set or ordered list of pairs $\langle x,\tau \rangle$, usually written as $x:\tau$, where $x$ is a variable and $\tau$ its type.

The judgement

$$\Gamma \vdash e:\tau$$

is read as "$e$ has type $\tau$ in context $\Gamma$ ".

For each function body type checks:

$$\Gamma = \{(f,\tau_1\times...\times\tau_n \to \tau_0)|(f,xs,(\tau_1,...,\tau_n),t_f,\tau_0)\in e\}$$

Typing Rules Example:
$$\begin{array}{c}
\Gamma\vdash b:Bool, \Gamma\vdash t_1:\tau, \Gamma\vdash t_2:\tau\\
\hline
\Gamma \vdash (\text{if}(b) t_1 \text{else} t_2): \tau \\
\end{array}$$

In statically typed programming languages, these environments are used and maintained by typing rules to type check a given program or expression.

== See also ==
- Type system
