= Software testing life cycle =

Software testing life cycle may refer to:

- Software testing
- Software development life cycle
- Software release life cycle
