= Ordered subset expectation maximization =

In mathematical optimization, the ordered subset expectation maximization (OSEM) method is an iterative method that is used in computed tomography.

In applications in medical imaging, the OSEM method is used for positron emission tomography (PET), for single-photon emission computed tomography (SPECT), and for X-ray computed tomography (X-ray CT) scans.

The OSEM method is related to the expectation–maximization (EM) method of statistics. The OSEM method is also related to methods of filtered back projection.
