= Harvey Friedman =

Harvey Friedman may refer to:

- Harvey Friedman (mathematician)
- Harvey Friedman (actor)
