= Y combinator =

Y combinator may refer to:

- Y Combinator, an American tech startup accelerator
- Y combinator (mathematics), a fixed-point combinator
