= To Mock a Mockingbird =

Book by Raymond Smullyan

To Mock a Mockingbird and Other Logic Puzzles: Including an Amazing Adventure in Combinatory Logic
- Author: Raymond Smullyan
- Language: English
- Publisher: Knopf
- Publication date: 1985
- Publication place: United States
- Media type: Print (paperback)
- Pages: 246
- ISBN: 0-19-280142-2
- OCLC: 248314322

To Mock a Mockingbird and Other Logic Puzzles: Including an Amazing Adventure in Combinatory Logic (1985, ISBN 0-19-280142-2) is a book by the mathematician and logician Raymond Smullyan. It contains many nontrivial recreational puzzles of the sort for which Smullyan is well known. It is also a gentle and humorous introduction to combinatory logic and the associated metamathematics, built on an elaborate ornithological metaphor.

Combinatory logic, functionally equivalent to the lambda calculus, is a branch of symbolic logic having the expressive power of set theory, and with deep connections to questions of computability and provability. Smullyan's exposition takes the form of an imaginary account of two men going into a forest and discussing the unusual "birds" (combinators) they find there (bird-watching was a hobby of one of the founders of combinatory logic, Haskell Curry, while the name of another founder, Moses Schönfinkel, means beautiful spark, or possibly beautiful little finch). Each species of bird in Smullyan's forest stands for a particular kind of combinator appearing in the conventional treatment of combinatory logic. Each bird has a distinctive call, which it emits when it hears the call of another bird. Hence, an initial call by certain "birds" gives rise to a cascading sequence of calls by a succession of birds.

Deep inside the forest dwells the Mockingbird, which imitates other birds hearing themselves. The resulting cascade of calls and responses analogizes to abstract models of computing. With this analogy in hand, one can explore advanced topics in the mathematical theory of computability, such as Church–Turing computability and Gödel's theorem.

While the book starts off with simple riddles, it eventually shifts to a tale of Inspector Craig of Scotland Yard, who appears in Smullyan's other books, traveling from forest to forest, learning from different professors about all the different kinds of birds. He starts off in a certain enchanted forest, then goes to an unnamed forest, then to Curry's Forest (named after Haskell Curry), then to Russell's Forest, then to The Forest Without a Name, then to Gödel's Forest, and finally to The Master Forest, where he also answers The Grand Question.

== See also ==
- SKI combinator calculus
- B, C, K, W system
- Fixed-point combinator
- Lambda calculus
- Logic puzzle
- Brain teaser
- Paradox
