= Knights of the Lambda Calculus =

Semi-fictional hacking organization

The Knights of the Lambda Calculus' recursive emblem celebrates LISP's theoretical foundation, the lambda calculus. Y in the emblem refers to the fixed-point combinator and the reappearance of the picture in itself refers to recursion.

The Knights of the Lambda Calculus is a semi-fictional organization of expert Lisp and Scheme hackers. The name refers to the lambda calculus, a mathematical formalism invented by Alonzo Church, with which Lisp is intimately connected, and references the Knights Templar.

There is no actual organization that goes by the name Knights of the Lambda Calculus; it mostly only exists as a hacker culture in-joke. The concept most likely originated at MIT. For example, in the Structure and Interpretation of Computer Programs video lectures, Gerald Jay Sussman presents the audience with the button, saying they are now members of this special group. However, according to the Jargon File, a "well-known LISPer" has been known to give out buttons with Knights insignia on them, and some people have claimed to have membership in the Knights.

== In popular culture ==
A group that evolved from, or is similar to them, called The Knights of the Eastern Calculus, makes a major appearance in the anime series Serial Experiments Lain, the logo of which is a reference to Freemasonry. References to MIT professors and other American computer scientists are prominent in Episode 9 of the series. At one point in the anime, Lain is seen with code displayed on her handheld device that appears to be Lisp.
