= Iota and Jot =

Esoteric programming languages

Iota, Jot, Zot
- Paradigms: Formal language, Turing tarpit, esoteric
- Designed by: Chris Barker
- Developer: Chris Barker
- First appeared: 2001; 25 years ago
- Final release: 2001 / 2001; 25 years ago
- Implementation language: Scheme, JavaScript
- Platform: Scheme interpreter, Web browser (JavaScript)
- License: Public domain
- Website: web.archive.org/web/20181024173237/http://www.nyu.edu/projects/barker/Iota/

Influenced
- Zot

In formal language theory and computer science, Iota and Jot (from Greek iota ι, Hebrew yodh י, the smallest letters in those two alphabets) are languages, extremely minimalist formal systems, designed to be even simpler than other more popular alternatives, such as lambda calculus and SKI combinator calculus. Thus, they can also be considered minimalist computer programming languages, or Turing tarpits, esoteric programming languages designed to be as small as possible but still Turing-complete. Both systems use only two symbols and involve only two operations. Both were created by professor of linguistics Chris Barker in 2001. Zot (2002) is a successor to Iota that supports input and output.

Note that this article uses Backus–Naur form to describe syntax.

== Universal iota ==
Chris Barker's universal iota combinator ι has the very simple λf.fSK structure defined here, using denotational semantics in terms of the lambda calculus,

$\iota := \lambda f.((fS)K) := \lambda f.((f\lambda a.\lambda b.\lambda c.((ac)(bc)))\lambda d.\lambda e.d)$	1

From this, one can recover the usual SKI expressions, thus:

$I\, =\, (\iota \iota),\; K\, =\, (\iota(\iota(\iota\iota))), \;S\, =\, (\iota(\iota(\iota(\iota\iota))))$	2

Because of its minimalism, it has influenced research concerning Chaitin's constant.

== Iota ==
Iota is the LL(1) language that uses prefix notation to denote trees constructed from the aforementioned universal iota ι combinator (at leaves), and function application (denoted 0),

iota = "1" | "0" iota iota

so that for example 0011011 denotes $((\iota\iota)(\iota\iota))$, whereas 0101011 denotes $(\iota(\iota(\iota\iota)))$.

== Jot ==
Jot is the regular language consisting of all sequences of 0 and 1,

jot = "" | jot "0" | jot "1"

The semantics is given by translation to SKI expressions. The empty string denotes $I$, $w0$ denotes $(([w]S)K)$, where $[w]$ is the translation of $w$, and $w1$ denotes $(S(K[w]))$.

The point of the $w1$ case is that the translation satisfies $(([w1]A)B) = ([w](A B))$ for arbitrary SKI terms $A$ and $B$. For example,
$$[w11100] = (([w1110]S)K) = (((([w111]S)K)S)K) = ((([w11](SK))S)K) = (([w1]((SK)S))K) = ([w](((SK)S)K)) = ([w]K)$$
holds for arbitrary strings $w$. Similarly,
$$[w11111000] = (((((([w11111]S)K)S)K)S)K) = ([w](((((SK)S)K)S)K)) = ([w]S)$$
holds as well. These two examples are the base cases of the translation of arbitrary SKI terms to Jot given by Barker, making Jot a natural Gödel numbering of all algorithms.

Jot is connected to Iota by the fact that $[w0] = (\iota[w])$ and by using the same identities on SKI terms for obtaining the basic combinators $K$ and $S$.

== Zot ==
The Zot and Positive Zot languages command Iota computations, from inputs to outputs by continuation-passing style, in syntax resembling Jot,

zot = pot | ""
pot = iot | pot iot
iot = "0" | "1"

where 1 produces the continuation $\lambda cL.L(\lambda lR.R(\lambda r.c(lr)))$, and 0 produces the continuation $\lambda c.c\iota$, and wi consumes the final input digit i by continuing through the continuation w.

== See also ==
- Lambda calculus
- Combinatory logic
- Binary combinatory logic
- SKI combinator calculus
