= Binary combinatory logic =

Computer programming language

Binary combinatory logic (BCL) is a computer programming language that uses binary terms 0 and 1 to create a complete formulation of combinatory logic using only the symbols 0 and 1. Using the S and K combinators, complex Boolean algebra functions can be made. BCL has applications in the theory of program-size complexity (Kolmogorov complexity).

== Definition ==
=== S-K Basis ===
Utilizing K and S combinators of the Combinatory logic, logical functions can be represented in as functions of combinators:

List of Logical Operations as Binary Combinators
Boolean Algebra	S-K Basis
True(1)	K(KK)
False(0)	K(K(SK))
AND	SSK
NOT	SS(S(S(S(SK))S))(KK)
OR	S(SS)S(SK)
NAND	S(S(K(S(SS(K(KK))))))S
NOR	S(S(S(SS(K(K(KK)))))(KS))
XOR	S(S(S(SS)(S(S(SK)))S))K

=== Syntax ===
Backus–Naur form:

 <term> ::= 00 | 01 | 1 <term> <term>

=== Semantics ===
The denotational semantics of BCL may be specified as follows:

- [ 00 ] == K
- [ 01 ] == S
- [ 1 <term1> <term2> ] == ( [<term1>] [<term2>] )

where "[...]" abbreviates "the meaning of ...". Here K and S are the KS-basis combinators, and ( ) is the application operation, of combinatory logic. (The prefix 1 corresponds to a left parenthesis, right parentheses being unnecessary for disambiguation.)

Thus there are four equivalent formulations of BCL, depending on the manner of encoding the triplet (K, S, left parenthesis). These are (00, 01, 1) (as in the present version), (01, 00, 1), (10, 11, 0), and (11, 10, 0).

The operational semantics of BCL, apart from eta-reduction (which is not required for Turing completeness), may be very compactly specified by the following rewriting rules for subterms of a given term, parsing from the left:

- 1100xy → x
- 11101xyz → 11xz1yz

where x, y, and z are arbitrary subterms. (Note, for example, that because parsing is from the left, 10000 is not a subterm of 11010000.)

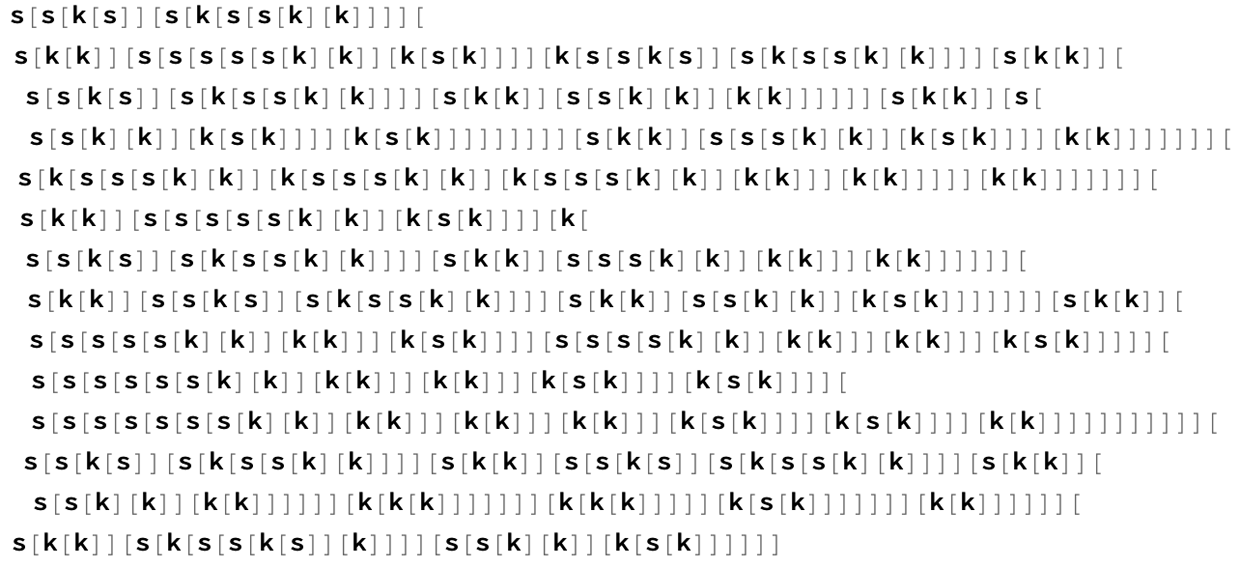
One step of Rule 110 Cellular Automata in SK-Basis(Written in the Wolfram Language).

BCL can be used to replicate algorithms like Turing machines and Cellular automata, BCL is Turing complete.

== See also ==
- Iota and Jot
