= John Tromp =

Dutch computer scientist

John Tromp is a Dutch computer scientist. He formerly worked for the Dutch Centre for Mathematics and Computer Science. Tromp discovered the number of legal states of the board game Go, and co-authored with Bill Taylor the Tromp–Taylor rules, which they call "the logical rules of Go".

He is also known for his work in binary combinatory logic (binary lambda calculus) and lambda diagrams that supply a graphical way of representing lambda calculus expressions. Tromp has done research on a lambda calculus-equivalent to the busy beaver function.
