= Chris Barker (linguist) =

American linguist

Chris Barker is the American chair professor of linguistics at New York University, famous for his discovery of the universal iota combinator and his continuation-based approach to scope.

Barker received a bachelor’s degree in English from Yale College in 1983, and both a bachelor’s degree in computer and information sciences in 1986, and a doctorate in linguistics in 1991 from the University of California, Santa Cruz

== Selected works ==
- Barker & Chan 2014: Continuations and Natural Language. ISBN 978-0-19-957502-2
- Barker 2001: Iota and Jot - the simplest languages?
