= Explicit substitution =

Aspect of lambda calculus

In computer science, lambda calculi are said to have explicit substitutions if they pay special attention to the formalization of the process of substitution. This is in contrast to the standard lambda calculus where substitutions are performed by beta reductions in an implicit manner which is not expressed within the calculus; the "freshness" conditions in such implicit calculi are a notorious source of errors. The concept has appeared in a large number of published papers in quite different fields, such as in abstract machines, predicate logic, and symbolic computation.

== Overview ==
A simple example of a lambda calculus with explicit substitution is λx, which adds one new form of term to the lambda calculus, namely the form M⟨x := N⟩, which reads "M where x will be substituted by N". (The meaning of the new term is the same as the common idiom "let x := N in M" from many programming languages.) λx can be written with the following rewriting rules:
$$\begin{array}{rll}
1) & (\lambda x.M) N \to M\langle x:=N \rangle \\[4pt]
2) & x\langle x := N \rangle \to N \\[4pt]
3) & x \langle y := N \rangle \to x & (x \neq y) \\[4pt]
4) & (M_1 M_2 ) \langle x := N \rangle \to (M_1 \langle x:= N \rangle) \ (M_2 \langle x := N \rangle) \\[4pt]
5) & (\lambda x.M) \langle y := N \rangle \to \lambda x.(M\langle y := N\rangle) & (x \neq y \text{ and } x \text{ not free in } N)
\end{array}$$

While making substitution explicit, this formulation still retains the complexity of the lambda calculus "variable convention", requiring arbitrary renaming of variables during reduction to ensure that the "(x ≠ y and x not free in N)" condition on the last rule is always satisfied before applying the rule. Therefore many calculi of explicit substitution avoid variable names altogether by using a so-called "name-free" De Bruijn index notation.

== History ==
Explicit substitutions were sketched in the preface of Curry's book on Combinatory logic and grew out of an ‘implementation trick’ used, for example, by AUTOMATH, and became a respectable syntactic theory in lambda calculus and rewriting theory. Though it actually originated with de Bruijn, the idea of a specific calculus where substitutions are part of the object language, and not of the informal meta-theory, is traditionally credited to Abadi, Cardelli, Curien, and Lévy. Their seminal paper on the λσ calculus explains that implementations of lambda calculus need to be very careful when dealing with substitutions. Without sophisticated mechanisms for structure-sharing, substitutions can cause a size explosion, and therefore, in practice, substitutions are delayed and explicitly recorded. This makes the correspondence between the theory and the implementation highly non-trivial and correctness of implementations can be hard to establish. One solution is to make the substitutions part of the calculus, that is, to have a calculus of explicit substitutions.

Once substitution has been made explicit, however, the basic properties of substitution change from being semantic to syntactic properties. One most important example is the "substitution lemma", which with the notation of λx becomes

$$\begin{align}
& (M\langle x := N\rangle )\langle y := P\rangle  = (M\langle y := P\rangle )\langle x := (N\langle y := P\rangle )\rangle \\[2pt]
& (\text{where } x \neq y \text{ and } x \text{ not free in } P)
\end{align}$$

A surprising counterexample, due to Melliès, shows that the way this rule is encoded in the original calculus of explicit substitutions is not strongly normalizing. Following this, a multitude of calculi were described trying to offer the best compromise between syntactic properties of explicit substitution calculi.

== See also ==
- Combinatory logic
- Substitution instance
