= Helmut Veith =

Austrian computer scientist

- Born: 5 February 1971; Vienna, Austria
- Died: 12 March 2016 (aged 45); Vienna, Austria
- Citizenship: Austria
- Education: TU Wien
- Scientific career
- Fields: Computer-aided Verification; Software engineering; Computer security; Logic in computer science
- Workplaces: TU Wien; Carnegie Mellon University; TU Darmstadt; TU Munich
- Doctoral advisor: Georg Gottlob
- Website: forsyte.at/people/veith/

Helmut Veith (5 February 1971 – 12 March 2016) was an Austrian computer scientist who worked on the areas of computer-aided verification, software engineering, computer security, and logic in computer science. He was a Professor of Informatics at the Vienna University of Technology (TU Wien), Austria.

== Education ==
Veith received his Diplom-Ingenieur in computational logic at TU Wien in 1994. He received his doctorate in computer science in 1998 under the supervision of Professor Georg Gottlob on the topic of computational complexity of logics and database query languages.

== Career and research ==
Veith was a professor at the Faculty of Informatics of TU Wien, and an adjunct professor at Carnegie Mellon University, Pittsburgh. Previously he was a professor at the Department of Computer Science of TU Darmstadt (2008–2009) and TU Munich (2003–2008), and an associate professor at TU Wien (2001–2003). He received his habilitation at TU Wien in 2001.

Veith published more than 120 refereed publications in the areas of computer-aided verification and program analysis, logic in computer science, software engineering, computer security, and theoretical computer science. He was a co-editor of the Handbook of Model Checking. In 2014, he was co-chair of the Vienna Summer of Logic 2014, the largest conference on logic and computer science in history.

Veith is best known for his role in the development of Counterexample-guided Abstraction Refinement (CEGAR), which is a key ingredient in modern model checkers for software and hardware. His research applies formal and logical methods to problems in software technology and engineering, focusing on model checking, software verification and testing, embedded software and computer security.

== Science communication ==
Veith was a co-founder of the Vienna Center for Logic and Algorithms (together with Stefan Szeider). Veith was member of the organizational board of the largest logic conference in the history – the Vienna Summer of Logic 2014, which consisted of twelve large conferences and numerous workshops, attracting over 2000 researchers from all over the world to Vienna. Veith served as the speaker of the FWF-funded Doctoral College on Logical Methods in Computer Science and as the deputy coordinator of the National Research Network Rigorous Systems Engineering (RiSE).

== Awards and honours ==
Veith was awarded his doctorate with highest distinction "sub auspiciis praesidentis" in a ceremony presided over by the president of Austria. With his co-authors, he received the CAV Award 2015 honouring contributions of fundamental importance to the field of computer-aided verification for his contribution to the development of CEGAR. His work on the software model checker MAGIC received the ACM Distinguished Paper Award for contribution to the study of verification of modular software. In 2016, Veith was posthumously awarded an ERC Advanced Grant on the topic Harnessing Model Checking Technology for Distributed Algorithms.
