= Kleene Award =

The Kleene Award is awarded at the annual IEEE Symposium on Logic in Computer Science (LICS) to the author(s) of the best student paper(s). A paper qualifies as a student paper if each author is a student at the date of the submission. Also eligible are authors who have graduated only recently, provided the submitted paper is based on work carried out when he or she still was a student. The award decision is made by the Program Committee.

The award is named after Stephen Cole Kleene, who did pioneering work in the field of logic as related to computer science.

== Past recipients ==
Past recipients of the Kleene award are tabulated below.

Year	Recipient	Paper
1995	Alexei P. Kopylov	"Decidability of Linear Affine Logic"
1996	Juha Nurmonen	"Counting Modulo Quantifiers on Finite Linearly Ordered Trees"
1996	Guy McCusker	"Games and Full Abstraction for FPC"
1997	Julian Rathke	"Unique Fixpoint Induction for Value-Passing Processes"
1998	Jean-Marie Le Bars	"Fragments of Existential Second-Order Logic without 0-1 Laws"
2000	Lars Birkedal	"A General Notion of Realizability"
2001	Kazushige Terui	"Light Affine Lambda Calculus and Polytime Strong Normalization"
2001	Frédéric Blanqui	"Definitions by Rewriting in the Calculus of Constructions"
2002	Albert Atserias	"Unsatisfiable Random Formulas are Hard to Certify"
2003	Benjamin Rossman	"Successor-Invariance in the Finite"
2004	Felix Klaedtke	"On the Automata Size for Presburger Arithmetic"
2005	Benjamin Rossman	"Existential Positive Types and Preservation under Homomorphisims"
2006	Ugo Dal Lago	"Context Semantics, Linear Logic and Computational Complexity"
2007	Nikos Tzevelekos	"Full abstraction for nominal general references"
2008	David Duris	"Hypergraph Acyclicity and Extension Preservation Theorems"
2009	Oliver Friedmann	"An Exponential Lower Bound for the Parity Game Strategy Improvement Algorithm as We Know it"
2010	Anthony Widjaja To	"Parikh Images of Grammars: Complexity and Applications"
2011	Willem Heijltjes	"Proof Nets for Additive Linear Logic with Units"
2012	Christoph Berkholz	"Lower Bounds for Existential Pebble Games and k-Consistency Tests"
2013	Ori Lahav	"From Frame Properties to Hypersequent Rules in Modal Logics"
2014	Yaron Velner	"Finite-memory strategy synthesis for robust multidimensional mean-payoff objectives"
2014	Flavien Breuvart	"On the characterization of models of H"
2015	Fabian Reiter	"Distributed Graph Automata"
2016	Steen Vester	"Winning Cores in Parity Games"
2017	Amina Doumane	"Constructive completeness for the linear-time mu-calculus"
2018	Étienne Miquey	"A sequent calculus with dependent types for classical arithmetic"
2019	Renaud Vilmart	"A Near-Minimal Axiomatisation of ZX-Calculus for Pure Qubit Quantum Mechanics"
2020	Julien Grange	"Successor-Invariant First-Order Logic on Classes of Bounded Degree"
2021	Moritz Lichter and Jamie Tucker-Foltz	
2022	Elena Di Lavore and Yoàv Montacute	
2024	Søren Brinck Knudstorp	"Relevant S is Undecidable"

== See also ==
- List of computer science awards
- Machtey Award
