= VSL =

VSL may refer to:

- VSL International, Swiss construction firm
- Value of a Statistical Life, or simply Value of life
- Variable speed of light, a feature of a family of hypotheses in physics
- Venezuelan Sign Language, form of sign language used in Venezuela
- Venezuelan Summer League, a defunct Minor League Baseball rookie league in Venezuela
- Vernon Systems Ltd, a museums collections management software company based in New Zealand
- Videsh Sanchar Nigam Limited, a company with NYSE stock ticker symbol VSL
- Vienna Summer of Logic, a combination of several major conferences and more than 70 workshops on mathematical logic which took place in July 2014
- Vienna Symphonic Library, a library of musical instrument samples
- Ville Saint-Laurent, a former city that became a borough of Montreal in 2002
- Volume of Sacred Law, in Freemasonry
- Vorspann System Losinger, an international post-tensioning specialist contractor owned by Bouygues
