= Rajeev Alur =

American computer scientist

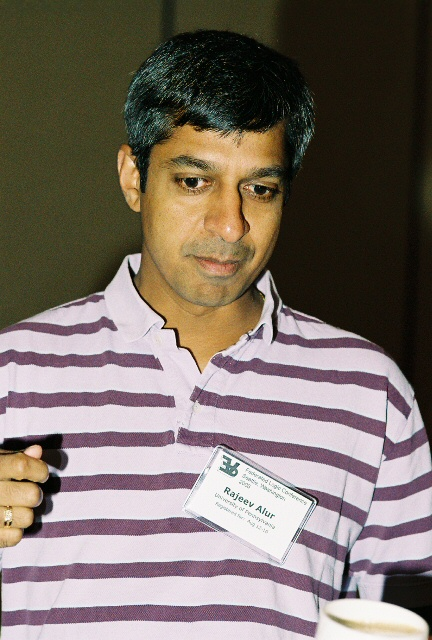
- Photo of Rajeev Alur from 2006
- Born: Pune
- Occupations: Professor of computer and Information Science

Rajeev Alur is an American professor of computer science at the University of Pennsylvania who has made contributions to formal methods, programming languages, and automata theory, including notably the introduction of timed automata (Alur and Dill, 1994) and nested words (Alur and Madhusudan, 2004).

Prof. Alur was born in Pune. He obtained his bachelor's degree in computer science from the Indian Institute of Technology Kanpur in 1987, and his Ph.D. in computer science from Stanford University in 1991. Before joining the University of Pennsylvania in 1997, he was with the Computing Science Research Center at Bell Laboratories. His research has included formal modeling and analysis of reactive systems, hybrid systems, model checking, software verification, design automation for embedded software, and program synthesis. He is a Fellow of the ACM, a Fellow of the IEEE, and has served as the chair of ACM SIGBED (Special Interest Group on Embedded Systems). He holds the title of Zisman Family Professor at UPenn since 2003.

== Awards and honors ==
- A CAREER award from the US National Science Foundation.
- The 2008 Computer Aided Verification Award for fundamental contributions to the theory of real-time systems verification (with David Dill).
- The 2010 LICS (IEEE Symposium on Logic in Computer Science) Test-of-Time award for the 1990 paper "Model-checking for real-time systems" (with David Dill and Costas Courcoubetis).
- The 2016 Alonzo Church Award with David Dill "for their invention of timed automata, a decidable model of real-time systems, which combines a novel, elegant, deep theory with widespread practical impact."
- The 2024 Knuth Prize for "outstanding contributions to the foundations of computer science for his introduction of novel models of computation which provide the theoretical foundations for analysis, design, synthesis, and verification of computer systems"
