= Vanessa Teague =

Australian cryptographer

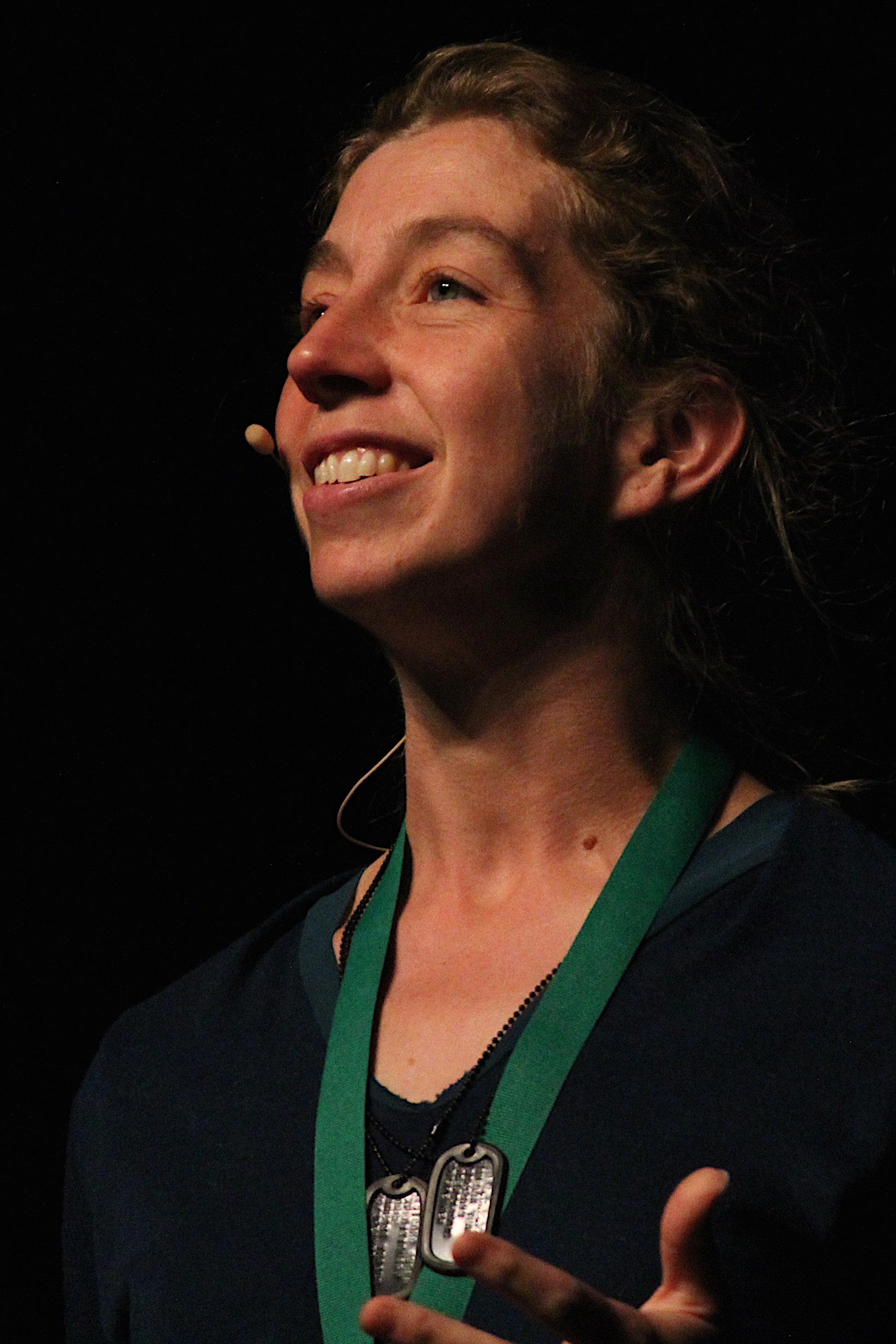
Teague at Kiwicon in Wellington, New Zealand (2015)

Vanessa Joy Teague is an Australian cryptographer, known for her work on secret sharing, cryptographic protocols, and the security of electronic voting. She was an associate professor of computing and information systems at the University of Melbourne, until resigning in February 2020 and is an Adjunct Associate Professor at the ANU College of Engineering and Computer Science. She is a member of the Board of Advisors of the Verified Voting Foundation.

== Education ==
Teague did her undergraduate studies at the University of Melbourne. In 2005 she completed a Ph.D. in computer science at Stanford University. Her dissertation, Combining Cryptography and Game Theory in Distributed Algorithms, was supervised by John C. Mitchell. Her time as a graduate student in the US overlapped with the 2000 United States presidential election between George W. Bush and Al Gore, and the controversy over the vote recount sparked her interest in the integrity of elections.

== Contributions ==
In 2017, Teague showed that historical data from the Australian Medicare Benefits Scheme that had supposedly been stripped of identifying details could be re-associated with the names of individual patients.

In 2018, she and Chris Culnane found a security flaw in the New Zealand census, in which the personal data of New Zealanders, supposedly confidential to the New Zealand government, were actually routed through and visible to a company in New York.

In 2019, Teague was part of a team that discovered a flaw in the Swiss national internet voting system that would allow undetected alteration of vote outcomes. The same flaw was later discovered to be present in voting systems in New South Wales, whose electoral commission nevertheless declared them to be safe to use.

Teague also became an outspoken critic of Australia's 2019 anti-encryption laws, at the same time that a change in Australian defence policy severely limited her ability to discuss matters related to cryptography with researchers in other countries.

== Recognition ==
In 2016 the Election Verification Network recognized Teague as the winner of their Election Integrity Research Excellence Award.
