= Vienna Summer of Logic =

Scientific event

Logo of the scientific event

The Vienna Summer of Logic was a scientific event in the summer of 2014, combining 12 major conferences and several workshops from the fields of mathematical logic, logic in computer science, and logic in artificial intelligence. The meetings took place from July 9 to 24, 2014, and attracted more than 2000 scientists and researchers.

The event was organized by the Kurt Gödel Society at Vienna University of Technology. Participating meetings include:

In the Logic in Computer Science stream (representing the Federated Logic Conference (FLoC)):

- International Conference on Computer Aided Verification (CAV)
- IEEE Computer Security Foundations Symposium (CSF)
- International Conference on Logic Programming (ICLP)
- International Joint Conference on Automated Reasoning (IJCAR)
- Conference on Interactive Theorem Proving (ITP)
- Joint meeting of the EACSL Annual Conference on Computer Science Logic (CSL) and the ACM/IEEE Symposium on Logic in Computer Science (LICS)
- International Conference on Rewriting Techniques and Applications (RTA) joint with the International Conference on Typed Lambda Calculi and Applications (TLCA)
- International Conference on Theory and Applications of Satisfiability Testing (SAT)
- more than 70 FLoC workshops
- FLoC Olympic Games (system competitions)
- SAT/SMT Summer School

In the Mathematical Logic stream:

- Logic Colloquium 2014 (LC)
- Logic, Algebra and Truth Degrees 2014 (LATD)
- Workshop on Compositional Meaning in Logic (GeTFun 2.0)
- The Infinity Workshop (INFINITY)
- Workshop on Logic and Games (LG)
- Workshop on Nonclassical Proofs: Theory, Applications and Tools (NCPROOFS)
- Kurt Gödel Fellowship Competition

In the Logic in Artificial Intelligence stream:

- International Conference on Principles of Knowledge Representation and Reasoning (KR)
- International Workshop on Description Logics (DL)
- International Workshop on Non-Monotonic Reasoning (NMR)
- International Workshop on Knowledge Representation for Health Care 2014 (KR4HC)
