= CBPV =

CBPV can refer to:

- Call-by-push-value, a programming language paradigm
- Chronic bee paralysis virus, a virus that affects honeybees
