= Georg Gottlob =

Austrian computer scientist

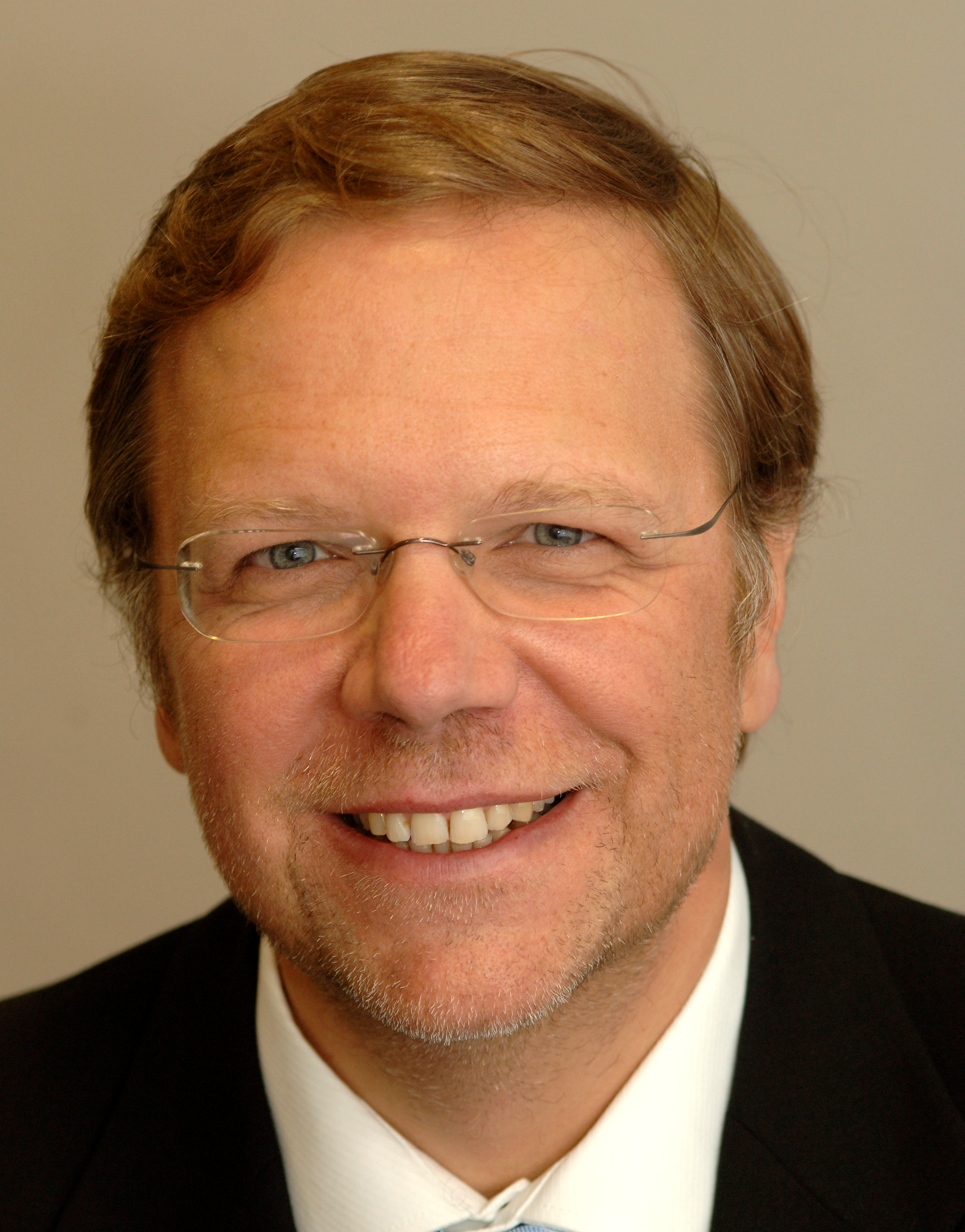
- Born: 30 June 1956 (age 70); Vienna, Austria
- Education: Vienna University of Technology
- Awards: Wittgenstein Award (1998); Royal Society Wolfson Research Merit Award (2006); FACM (2007); MAE; MAAS; Member of the Leopoldina; FRS (2010); ISI highly cited researcher
- Scientific career
- Fields: Algorithms in Artificial Intelligence and Information systems; Databases; Database theory; Computational complexity theory; Logic in computer science
- Workplaces: University of Oxford; St John's College, Oxford; Oxford-Man Institute; Technische Universität Wien
- Thesis: Mehrwertige Logik – Aufbau und Anwendung in der Informatik (1981)
- Doctoral advisor: Curt Christian
- Doctoral students: Stefan Szeider; Helmut Veith
- Website: cs.ox.ac.uk/people/georg.gottlob

Georg Gottlob FRS is an Austrian-Italian computer scientist who works in the areas of database theory, logic, and artificial intelligence and is Professor of Informatics at the University of Calabria. He was Professor at the University of Oxford.

== Education ==
Gottlob obtained his undergraduate and PhD degrees in computer science at Vienna University of Technology in 1981.

== Career and research ==
Gottlob is currently a chaired professor at the University of Calabria in Italy where he joined in 2023 due to the "Fantastic Équipe and great potential". Until then, he was a professor of computing science at the Oxford University Department of Computer Science, where he helped establish the information systems research group. He is also a Fellow of St John's College, Oxford. Previously, he was a professor of computer science at Vienna University of Technology, where he still maintains an adjunct position. He was elected a member of the Royal Society in May 2010. He is a founding member of the Oxford-Man Institute.

He has published more than 250 scientific articles in the areas of computational logic, database theory, and artificial intelligence, and one textbook on logic programming and databases.

In the area of artificial intelligence, he is best known for his influential early work on the complexity of nonmonotonic logics and on (generalised) hypertree decompositions, a framework for obtaining tractable structural classes of constraint satisfaction problems, and a generalisation of the notion of tree decomposition from graph theory. This work has also had substantial impact in database theory, since it is known that the problem of evaluating conjunctive queries on relational databases is equivalent to the constraint satisfaction problem. His work on XML query languages (notably XPath) has helped create the complexity-theoretical foundations of this area.

== Awards and honours ==
Gottlob has received numerous awards and honours including election to the Royal Society in 2010. His nomination for the Royal Society reads:

Georg Gottlob has made fundamental contributions to both artificial intelligence and to database systems. His research has centred on the algorithmic and logical aspects of knowledge representation, database queries, and recently for web data processing. His work has resulted in the invention of several efficient algorithms for constraint satisfaction, web data extraction and database query processing, some of which are now in widespread use. He has developed a common core to the underlying principles of artificial intelligence and databases. In his work on clarifying the intrinsic complexity of problems in these areas, Gottlob has solved open problems in computational logic, non-monotonic reasoning and database theory.

Gottlob has also been designated as an ECCAI fellow in 2002, and received honorary doctorates from the University of Klagenfurt (2016) and the University of Vienna (2020).
