= Krzysztof R. Apt =

Polish computer scientist

- Born: December 26, 1949 (age 76); Katowice, Poland
- Citizenship: Polish
- Education: University of Wrocław
- Known for: Alma-0
- Scientific career
- Fields: computer science semantics program correctness distributed computing game theory
- Workplaces: University of Warsaw; University of Amsterdam

Krzysztof R. Apt (born 26 December 1949 in Katowice, Poland) is a Polish computer scientist. He defended his PhD in mathematical logic in Warsaw, Poland in 1974. His research interests include program correctness and semantics, use of logic as a programming language, distributed computing, and game theory. Besides his own research, he has been heavily involved in service to the computing community, notably by promoting the use of logic in computer science (in particular by founding a new journal) and by advocating open access to scientific literature.

== Academic career ==
Apt has held various scientific positions in Poland, the Netherlands, France, the U.S. (the William B. Blakemore II Professor, Computer Science, UT Austin, 1987–1990), and Singapore (Visiting professor, Computer Science, NUS, 2002–2005). (Note: Apt's various positions are listed in his member webpage of the Academia Europaea:)

Apt is a Fellow at CWI (National Research Institute for Mathematics and Computer Science) in Amsterdam and Affiliated Professor at the University of Warsaw. Since 2014 he is also professor emeritus at the University of Amsterdam.

His research interests include program correctness and semantics, use of logic as a programming language, distributed computing, and game theory. In particular, with coauthors he introduced the concept of stratification in logic programming to provide a way to deal with negation in logic and Datalog programs. His comprehensive survey of Hoare logic, written with Ernst-Rüdiger Olderog, summarizes the history of the subject since its inception in 1969.

Apt is a member of Academia Europaea, which serves as "a pan-European Academy of Sciences, Humanities and Letters"; membership is by invitation only and follows a rigorous peer review selection process. He is the founder and first Editor-in-Chief of the ACM Transactions on Computational Logic and past president of the Association for Logic Programming (ALP). He is one of the three initiators of the Witold Lipski Prize for Young Researchers in Computer Science.

Apt has long been an active advocate of open and free access to scientific publications(e.g.) and is a member of the Advisory Committee of the portion of the repository arXiv known as the Computing Research Repository (CoRR)

== Books published ==
- — (1997). From Logic Programming to Prolog. Prentice Hall. ISBN 978-0-13-230368-2. S2CID 46574027.
- — (2003). Principles of Constraint Programming. Cambridge University Press. doi:10.1017/CBO9780511615320. ISBN 978-0-521-82583-2. S2CID 5616873.
- —; Wallace, Marc (2007). Constraint Logic Programming using Eclipse. Cambridge University Press. doi:10.1017/CBO9780511607400. ISBN 978-0-521-86628-6. S2CID 2249540.
- —; de Boer, Frank; Olderog, Ernst-Rüdiger (2009). Verification of Sequential and Concurrent Programs (3rd ed.). Springer-Verlag. doi:10.1007/978-1-4757-4376-0. ISBN 978-1848827448. S2CID 9478945.
- — (2023). A Brief History of Mathematics for Curious Minds. World Scientific. doi:10.1142/13518. ISBN 978-981-12-8044-3. S2CID 259465497.

== Books edited ==
- —, ed. (1989). Logics and Models of Concurrent Systems. Springer Verlag, Berlin, Heidelberg. doi:10.1007/978-3-642-82453-1. ISBN 0387151818. S2CID 21461231.
- —; de Bakker, J.W.; Rutten, J.M., eds. (1993). Logic Programming Languages: Constraints, Functions, and Objects. MIT Press, Cambridge, MA. ISBN 9780262511674. S2CID 60961390. Presents results from a three-year, ESPRIT-funded effort to explore the integration of the foundational issues of functional, logic, and object-oriented programming
- —; Marek, V.W.; Truszczynski, M.; Warren, D.S., eds. (1999). The Logic Programming Paradigm: A 25-Year perspective. Artificial Intelligence. Springer Verlag. doi:10.1007/978-3-642-60085-2. ISBN 978-3-642-64249-4. S2CID 2807312. Reveals the evolution of logic programming since its inception and the impressively broad scope of current research in the field
- —; Graedel, Erich, eds. (2011). Lectures on Game Theory for Computer Scientists. Cambridge University Press. doi:10.1017/CBO9780511973468. ISBN 9780511973468.
- —; Hoare, Tony, eds. (2022). Edsger Wybe Dijkstra: His Life, Work, and Legacy. ACM, New York, NY. doi:10.1145/3544585. ISBN 9781450397735. S2CID 250497032. In the ACM series of books on Turing Award winners
