= European Master Program in Computational Logic =

Erasmus Mundus co-operative MSc program

The European Master's Program in Computational Logic (EMCL) was a two years joint MSc programme offering a joint degree between four European universities as a part of the Erasmus Mundus co-operation and mobility programme. So far (from 2004 to 2008), this programme had more than 130 students.

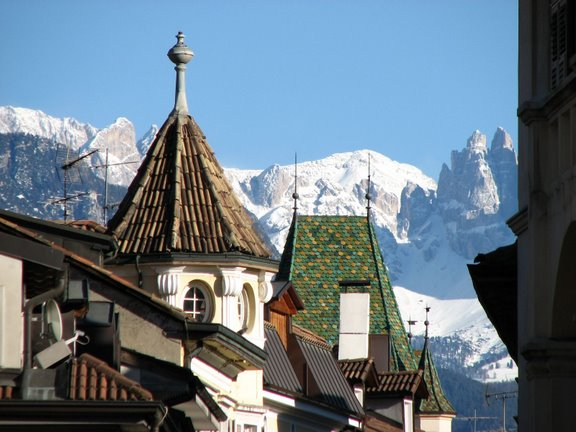
Bozen-Bolzano, in the heart of the Italian Alps

The partner institutions are:

- Technische Universität Dresden, Germany (coordinating university)
- Free University of Bozen-Bolzano, Italy
- Universidade Nova de Lisboa, Portugal
- Technische Universität Wien, Austria
- NICTA, Australia

Based on a solid foundation in mathematical logic, theoretical computer science, artificial intelligence and declarative programming students will acquire in-depth knowledge necessary to specify, implement and run complex systems as well as to prove properties of these systems.

In particular, the focus of instruction will be in deduction systems, knowledge representation and reasoning, ontologies, artificial intelligence, formal specification and verification, logic and computability. This basic knowledge is then applied to areas like natural language processing, the semantic web, bioinformatics, information systems and database technology, software and hardware verification.

Students will acquire practical experience and will become familiar in the use of tools within these applications. In addition, students will be prepared for a future PhD, they will come in contact with the international research community and will be integrated into ongoing research projects. They will develop competence in foreign languages and international relationships, thereby improving their social skills.

The European Master's Program in Computational Logic is sponsored by the European Network of Excellence on Computational Logic (CoLogNET), the European Association of Logic, Language and Information (FoLLI), the IBM Center for Advanced Studies (IBM-CAS), the European Coordinating Committee for Artificial Intelligence (ECCAI), the Italian Association for Artificial Intelligence (AI*IA), the Italian Association for Informatics (AICA, member of the Council of European Professional Informatics Societies), the Italian Association for Logic and its Applications (AILA), and the Portuguese Association for Artificial Intelligence (APPIA).

The European PhD Program in Computational Logic (EPCL) extends on EMCL and is offered by the same four universities as EMCL. It will start in fall 2011.
