= ACM SIGLOG =

Research association in computer science

ACM SIGLOG or SIGLOG is the Association for Computing Machinery Special Interest Group on Logic and Computation. It publishes a news magazine (SIGLOG News), and has the annual ACM–IEEE Symposium on Logic in Computer Science (LICS) as its flagship conference. In addition, it publishes an online newsletter, the SIGLOG Monthly Bulletin (formerly the LICS Newsletter), and "maintains close ties" with the related academic journal ACM Transactions on Computational Logic.

The creation of this special interest group was suggested in 2007 by Moshe Vardi and Dana Scott, and Vardi was the primary author of a more detailed proposal for its creation. It was founded in 2014, with Prakash Panangaden as its founding chair, and with Andrzej Murawski as the founding editor of the newsletter.

== Alonzo Church Award ==
In 2015, SIGLOG established, in cooperation with EATCS, EACSL and the Kurt Gödel Society, the Alonzo Church Award for Outstanding Contributions to Logic and Computation. The list of past award winners is maintained by the EACSL.

- 2016 Rajeev Alur and David Dill "for their invention of timed automata, a decidable model of real-time systems, which combines a novel, elegant, deep theory with widespread practical impact."
- 2017 Samson Abramsky, Radha Jagadeesan, Pasquale Malacaria, Martin Hyland, Luke Ong, and Hanno Nickau "for providing a fully-abstract semantics for higher-order computation through the introduction of game models, thereby fundamentally revolutionising the field of programming language semantics, and for the applied impact of these models."
- 2018 Tomás Feder and Moshe Y. Vardi "for fundamental contributions to the computational complexity of constraint-satisfaction problems."
- 2019 Murdoch J. Gabbay and Andrew M. Pitts "for their ground-breaking work introducing the theory of nominal representations, a powerful and elegant mathematical model for computing with data involving atomic names."
- 2020 Ronald Fagin, Phokion G. Kolaitis, Renée J. Miller, Lucian Popa, and Wang-Chiew Tan "for their ground-breaking work on laying the logical foundations for data exchange."
- 2021 Georg Gottlob, Christoph Koch, Reinhard Pichler, Klaus U. Schulz, and Luc Segoufin "for their fundamental work on logic-based web data extraction and querying tree-structured data."
- 2022 Dexter Kozen "for his fundamental work on developing the theory and applications of Kleene Algebra with Tests, an equational system for reasoning about iterative programs."
- 2023 Lars Birkedal, Aleš Bizjak, Derek Dreyer, Jacques-Henri Jourdan, Ralf Jung, Robbert Krebbers, Filip Sieczkowski, Kasper Svendsen, David Swasey and Aaron Turon "for the design and implementation of Iris, a higher-order concurrent separation logic framework."
- 2024 Thomas Ehrhard and Laurent Regnier "for giving a logical and computational account of differentiation, bringing Taylor expansion to the Curry-Howard correspondence, which had a major impact on programming language semantics."
- 2025 Paul Blain Levy "for his fundamental study of effectful λ-calculi through the call-by-push-value calculus."
- 2026 Pablo Barceló, Leonid Libkin, Wim Martens, Juan Reutter, Miguel Romero, Moshe Vardi, and Domagoj Vrgoč "for laying foundations of logical languages for querying property graphs that found adoption in the SQL and GQL international standards within a decade."
