= Verified Voting Foundation =

US voting technology organization with lobbying affiliate

The Verified Voting Foundation is a non-governmental, nonpartisan organization founded in 2004 by David L. Dill, a computer scientist focused on the impact of election technology. Pamela Smith is the president of both Verified Voting and the Verified Voting Foundation. The organization's mission is to "strengthen democracy for all voters by promoting the responsible use of technology in elections." Verified Voting works with public officials and policymakers to mitigate the risks associated with novel voting technologies used in local and state elections

== History ==
=== Foundation ===
David L. Dill's research required him to testify on "electronic voting before the U.S. Senate and the Commission on Federal Election Reform". These interests ultimately led him to establishing the Verified Voting Foundation in 2003.

== Activities ==
=== Partnerships ===
Verified Voting has worked closely with many organizations including the Brennan Center for Justice and Common Cause; in 2020 the three organizations advocated for election best practices, such as paper ballots and adequate election security funding, in key swing states.

Verified Voting participates in several coalitions, including the Secure Our Vote Coalition and the National Task Force on Election Crises. Secure Our Vote helped to successfully block legislation permitting internet voting in Puerto Rico. Verified Voting's work with the National Task Force on Election Crises supported the Task Force's mission to develop responses to potential election crises in 2020 and guarantee a peaceful transfer of power.

=== Lobbying activities ===
Verified Voting also advocates for election security. The Foundation conducts this lobbying work as part of its 501(c)(4) lobbying arm. The organization meets with federal lawmakers, sends letters, and issues statements for funding paper ballots and RLAs. It also advocates in specific states to address election security and voter integrity issues, e.g. in 2020, the organization worked in Virginia to increase safe voting options amidst the pandemic, successfully advocated against internet voting legislation in New Jersey, and provided advice on RLA regulation to officials in California and Oregon.

=== The Verifier Tool ===
Since 2004, Verified Voting has been collecting data on the nation's voting machines and making it available through a web-based interactive tool called "the Verifier." For each federal election cycle, the Verifier documents the specific voting equipment in use in every jurisdiction across the country. The Verifier is available for use by election officials, academics, organizations, the news media, and general public. The Verifier has supported national election protection operations, state advocacy, policy making, reporting, and congressional research inquiries. To maintain the database, Verified Voting liaises with election officials, monitors local news stories, and researches certification documents.

== Stances ==
=== Stance on paper ballots ===
Verified Voting advocates for the use of voter-verified paper ballots that "create tangible and auditable records of votes cast in an election." Paper trails generated by voter-verified paper ballots "provide a reliable way to check that the computers were not compromised (whether through human error or malfeasance)," an important point given that 99% of all ballots cast in the United States are counted by a computer. Verified Voting advises state and local jurisdictions to help them "implement best practices for election security." The organization advocates that election officials avoid using electronic voting systems which do not provide a paper trail.

In 2022, legislators in at least six states and local jurisdictions have proposed to prohibit the use of ballot tabulating machines. The proposals stem from unproven theories that election machines around the country were hacked and votes were changed. Verified Voting indicated that current hand counting of ballots is rare, and is used mostly in situations where there are few ballots to count.

=== Stance on internet voting ===
Verified Voting highlights risks of online voting and recommends that state and local governments avoid adopting these technologies. The organization argues that elections held online would be "easy targets for attackers." Online voting lacks the capacity to generate a voter-verified paper record and cannot protect a voter's privacy or the integrity of their ballot. A 2016 report co-authored by the Electronic Privacy Information Center and Verified Voting concluded that "as states permit the marking and transmitting of marked ballots over the Internet, the right to a secret ballot is eroded and the integrity of our elections is put at risk."

Verified Voting notes that with mobile voting, there is no way to determine the security of "the actual device that voters cast their votes on..." Verified Voting argues that while "blockchain technology is designed to keep information secure once it is received," such technology "cannot defend against the multitude of threats to that information before it is entered in the blockchain."

=== Post-election audits and risk-limiting audits ===
Verified Voting advises state and local governments to pilot and implement and post-election audits and risk-limiting audits (RLAs). Post-election tabulation audits routinely check voting system performance and accuracy—not the general results of an election. Risk-limiting audits "provide reason to trust that the final outcome matches the ballots." RLAs accomplish this by checking a "random sample of voter-verifiable paper ballots, seeking evidence that the reported election outcome was correct, if it was." The 'correct' outcome is what a full hand count of the ballots would reveal. RLAs continue checking random samples until there is convincing evidence that the outcome is correct. RLAs can trigger full hand recounts if the audit results do not support the reported election outcome.
