= Prakash Panangaden =

American/Canadian computer scientist (born 1954)

Prakash Panangaden FRS FRSC
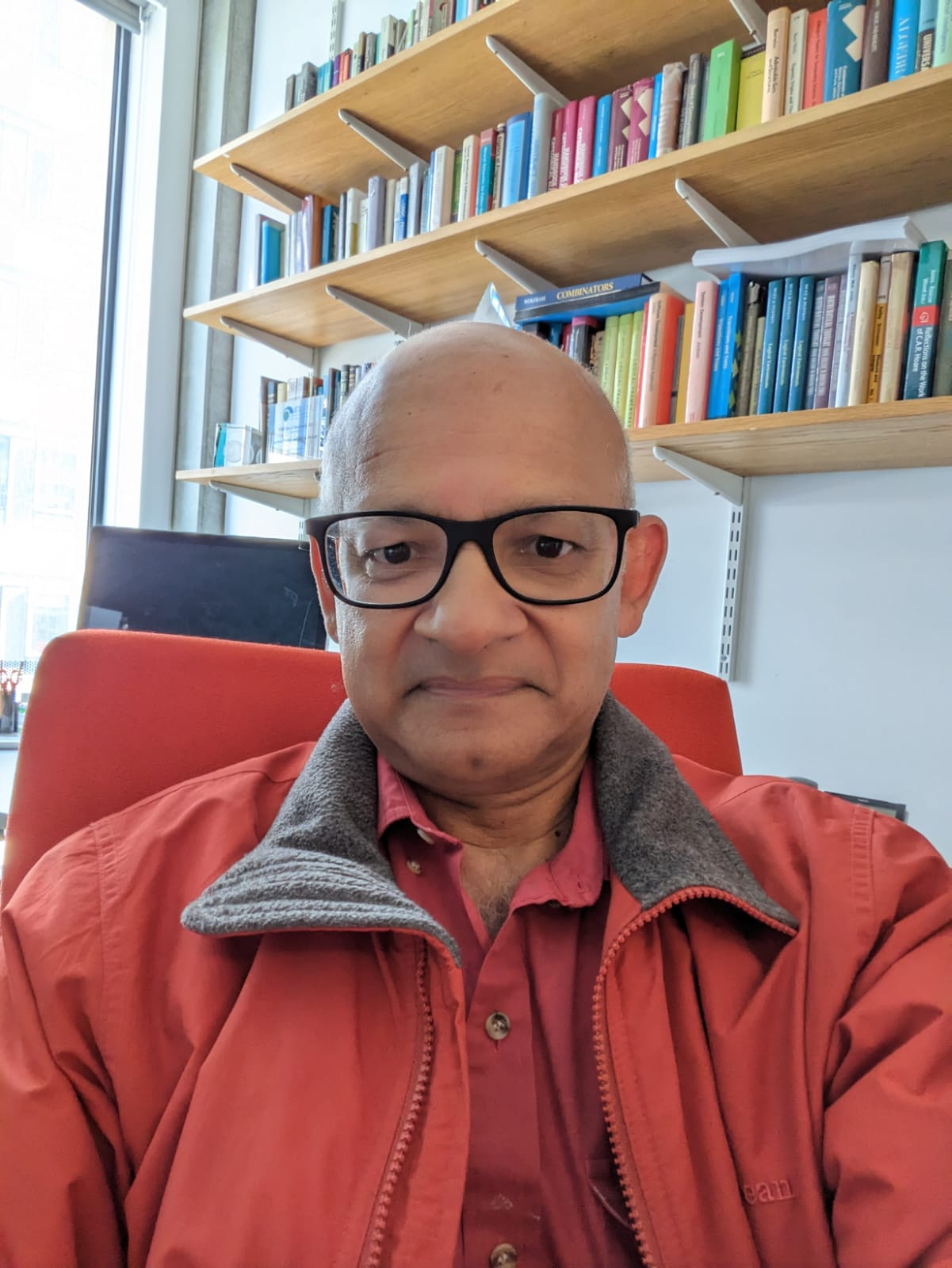
- Panangaden in 2025
- Born: March 11, 1954; Pune, Maharashtra, India
- Education: IIT Kanpur; University of Chicago; University of Wisconsin–Milwaukee; University of Utah
- Known for: Markov processes, programming language theory, concurrency theory and quantum field theory in curved space-time
- Spouse(s): Laurie Hendren (m. 1988; died 2019) Jane Hillston (m. 2025)
- Awards: Fellow of the Royal Society of Canada (2013) Fellow of the Royal Society (2025)
- Scientific career
- Fields: Computer Science, Physics
- Workplaces: Cornell University, McGill University
- Doctoral advisor: Leonard Parker
- Website: www.cs.mcgill.ca/~prakash

Prakash Panangaden is an American/Canadian computer scientist noted for his research in programming language theory, concurrency theory, Markov processes and duality theory. Earlier he worked on quantum field theory in curved space-time and radiation from black holes. He is the founding Chair of the ACM Special Interest Group on Logic and Computation (ACM SIGLOG).

== Biography ==
Prakash Panangaden was born in Pune, India on March 11, 1954. He attended school at the Calcutta Boys' School, Kolkata. He received a PhD from the University of Wisconsin–Milwaukee under the supervision of Leonard Parker. His PhD thesis was on renormalization of interacting fields in curved spacetime.

Prakash has successfully graduated 19 students and has in total 41 academic descendants, 8 of whom are women.

He joined the Department of Computer Science at Cornell University in 1985 as an Assistant Professor, where he worked in the Nuprl project and co-authored a book. He moved to McGill University as an associate professor in the School of Computer Science in 1990 and was promoted to professor in 1996.

He has been keynote speaker at many conferences, including the two top conferences in the field – LICS and ICALP.

== Awards ==
In 2017, the Test-of-Time Award Committee consisting of Christel Baier, Amy Felty (chair), Andrew Pitts and Nicole Schweikardt chose the paper Bisimulation for Labelled Markov Processes (by Richard Blute, Josee Desharnais, Abbas Edalat, Prakash Panangaden) as one of two papers from LICS 1997 that has had the most impact in the 20 years since its publication. In 2013 Prakash Panagaden was elected a FRSC. His citation reads: "Prakash Panangaden's research career has spanned computer science, mathematics and physics. He has worked on programming languages, probabilistic systems, quantum computation and relativity. He is particularly known for deep connections between domain theory and continuous-state Markov processes where he and his colleagues proved a striking logical characterization theorem. He and Keye Martin discovered a remarkable way to reconstruct spacetime topology from causal structure using mathematical ideas from programming languages."

He was honoured on his 60th birthday by his research community. There was a three-day symposium, called PrakashFest, held at Oxford University and a Festschrift was published by Springer-Verlag. The summary of the Festschrift reads: "This Festschrift volume contains papers presented at a conference, Prakash Fest, held in honor of Prakash Panangaden, in Oxford, UK, in May 2014, to celebrate his 60th birthday. Prakash Panangaden has worked on a large variety of topics including probabilistic and concurrent computation, logics and duality and quantum information and computation. Despite the enormous breadth of his research, he has made significant and deep contributions. For example, he introduced logic and a real-valued interpretation of the logic to capture equivalence of probabilistic processes quantitatively."

In 1999 he was awarded the Leo Yaffe Award by the Faculty of Science of McGill University for excellence in teaching.

In 2016 he was awarded the Principal’s Prize for Excellence in Teaching from McGill University. In 2022 he was awarded the Class of 1890 Outstanding Teaching Award by the Faculty of Engineering, McGill University. He is also an ACM Fellow from 2020 and was elected a Fellow of the Royal Society in 2025.

In 2022 he was again awarded the prestigious LICS Test of Time Award for a 2002 joint paper written with Josée Desharnais (Laval), Vineet Gupta (Google) and Radha Jagadeesan (De Paul University). “The metric analogue of weak bisimulation for probabilistic processes” was deemed one of the two most influential papers from that year after 20 years.
