= Leonard Parker =

Leonard E. Parker
- Born: 1938 (age 87–88); New York City, US
- Education: Harvard University
- Known for: Quantum field theory in curved spacetime
- Scientific career
- Fields: Quantum physics
- Workplaces: University of Wisconsin–Milwaukee
- Thesis: The Creation of Particles in an Expanding Universe (1966)
- Doctoral advisor: Sidney Coleman
- Doctoral students: Laura Mersini-Houghton; Prakash Panangaden

Leonard Emanuel Parker (born Leonard Pearlman; in 1938) is a distinguished professor emeritus of physics and a former director of the Center for Gravitation and Cosmology at the University of Wisconsin–Milwaukee. During the late 1960s, Parker established a new area of physics—quantum field theory in curved spacetime. Specifically, by applying the technique of Bogoliubov transformations to quantum field theory with a changing gravitational field, he discovered the physical mechanism now known as cosmological particle production. His breakthrough discovery has a surprising consequence: the expansion of the universe can create particles out of the vacuum. His work inspired research by hundreds of physicists and has been cited in more than 2,000 research papers; it was credited in the memoirs of Soviet physicist Andrei Sakharov and helped Stephen Hawking discover the creation of particles by black holes.

Along with David Toms of Newcastle University, Parker co-wrote a latest addition to graduate-level textbooks on quantum field theory in curved spacetime, entitled Quantum Field Theory in Curved Spacetime: Quantized Fields and Gravity (Cambridge University Press, 2009, ISBN 978-0-521-87787-9).

He received his PhD from Harvard University in 1967. His advisor was Sidney Coleman.

== Awards and honors ==
- 1984 Elected Fellow, American Physical Society
- 2000 The Parker symposium
