= Laura Mersini-Houghton =

American cosmologist and theoretical physicist

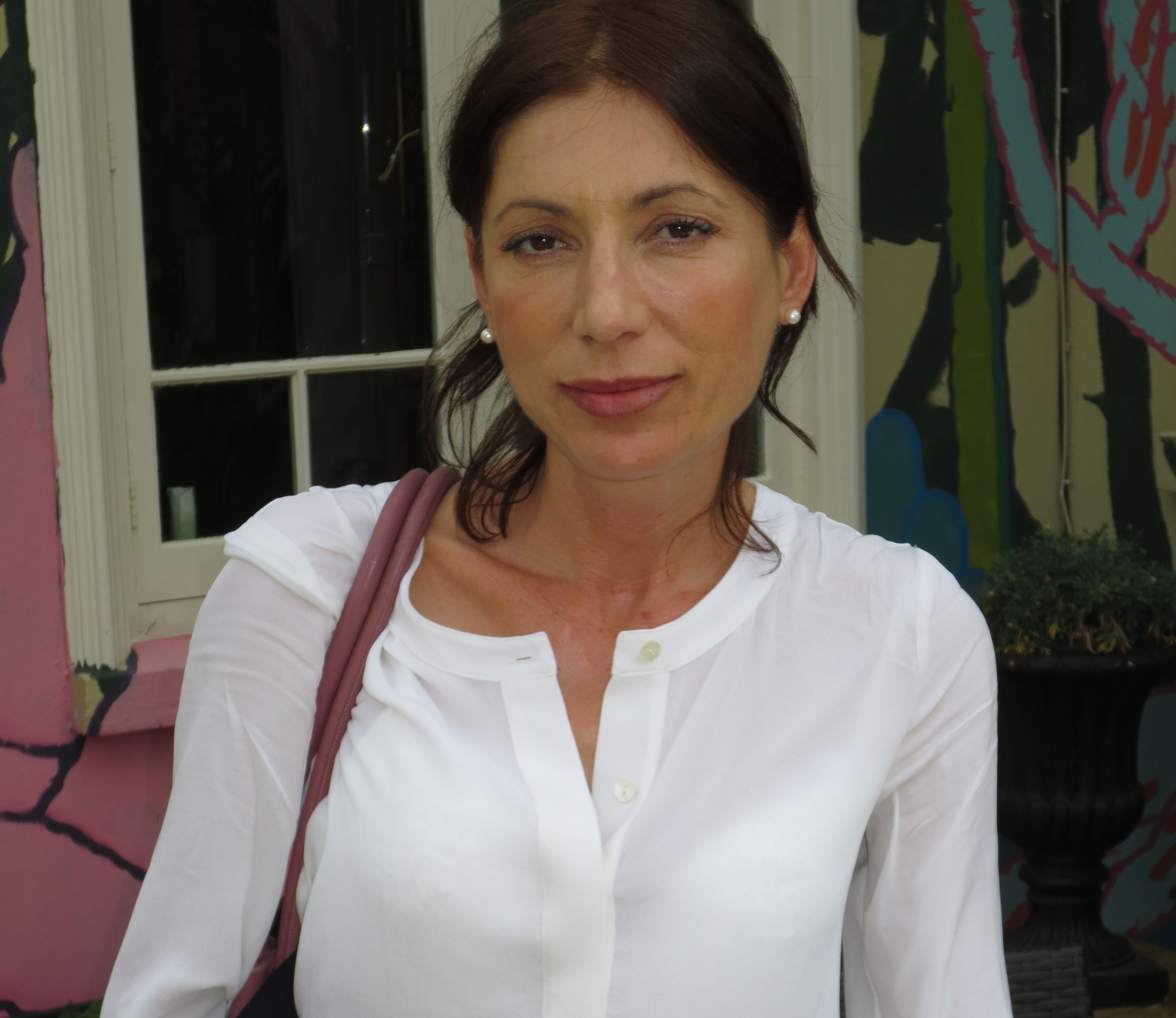
- Mersini-Houghton in 2016
- Born: Laura Mersini; Tirana, Albania
- Education: Tirana University; University of Maryland; University of Wisconsin–Milwaukee
- Known for: Multiverse, Origin of the Universe theory, Hawking radiation theory
- Spouse: Jeff Houghton
- Children: 1
- Scientific career
- Fields: cosmology and theoretical physics
- Workplaces: University of North Carolina at Chapel Hill
- Doctoral advisor: Leonard Parker

Laura Mersini-Houghton (née Mersini) is an Albanian-American cosmologist and theoretical physicist, and professor at the University of North Carolina at Chapel Hill. She is a proponent of the multiverse hypothesis and the author of a theory for the origin of the universe that holds that our universe is one of many selected by quantum gravitational dynamics of matter and energy. Mersini-Houghton has claimed that her theory explains unusual astrophysical data. She argues that anomalies in the current structure of the universe are best explained as the gravitational tug exerted by other universes.

== Biography ==
Laura Mersini was born in Tirana, Albania, as a daughter of the mathematician and eminent economist Nexhat Mersini.

Mersini-Houghton received her B.S. degree from the University of Tirana, Albania.

In 1994, Mersini-Houghton was a Fulbright scholar at the University of Maryland, College Park for 8 months.

In 1997, Mersini-Houghton was awarded her M.Sc. by the University of Maryland.

In 2000, Mersini-Houghton completed her Ph.D. at the University of Wisconsin–Milwaukee.

From 2000 to 2002, after earning her doctorate, Mersini-Houghton was a postdoctoral fellow at the Italian Scuola Normale Superiore di Pisa.

From 2002 to 2003, Mersini-Houghton had a postdoctoral fellowship at Syracuse University.

In January 2004, Mersini-Houghton accepted a position as assistant professor of theoretical physics and cosmology at the University of North Carolina. In a series of papers published between 2004 and 2006, she presented a theory that the universe arose from a multiverse, and made a series of testable predictions which included the existence of the Giant Void. She was granted tenure in 2008 and promotion to associate professor in 2009 and full professor later.

On 11 October 2010, Mersini-Houghton appeared in a BBC programme entitled What Happened Before the Big Bang (along with Michio Kaku, Neil Turok, Andrei Linde, Roger Penrose, Lee Smolin, and other physicists), where she propounded her theory of the universe as a wave function on the landscape multiverse. Mersini-Houghton's work on multiverse theory is discussed in the epilogue of a recently published biography of Hugh Everett III. Her predictions were successfully tested recently by the Planck satellite experiment. See also a discussion of her ideas in the context of the history and philosophical implications of the idea of a multiverse here.

In September 2014, Mersini-Houghton claimed to demonstrate mathematically that, given certain assumptions about black hole firewalls, current theories of black hole formation are flawed. She claimed that Hawking radiation causes the star to shed mass at a rate such that it no longer has the density sufficient to create a black hole. With Stephen Hawking, she organized a historic conference in 2015 in Stockholm to discuss these fundamental topics.

== Teaching ==
Mersini-Houghton teaches graduate and undergraduate classes in Quantum Mechanics at the University of North Carolina at Chapel Hill. https://physics.unc.edu/people/mersini-houghton-laura/

== Bibliography ==
- Mersini-Houghton, Laura; Vaas, Rudy, eds. (2012). The Arrows of Time: A Debate in Cosmology. Fundamental Theories of Physics. Berlin: Springer. ISBN 9783642232589.
- Mersini-Houghton, Laura (2022). Before the Big Bang: The Origin of Our Universe from the Multiverse. London: Bodley Head. ISBN 9781847925510.

== Sources ==
- Meet Laura Mersini-Houghton – an interview with Mersini-Houghton on North Carolina Public Radio
