= Benjamin Rossman =

American mathematician

Benjamin E. Rossman is an American mathematician and theoretical computer scientist, specializing in computational complexity theory. He is currently an associate professor of computer science and mathematics at Duke University.

== Biography ==
He graduated from the University of Pennsylvania with B.A. in 2001 and M.A. in 2002. He received in 2011 his Ph.D. with advisor Madhu Sudan from MIT with thesis Average-Case Complexity of Detecting Cliques. From 2010 to 2013 Rossman was a postdoc at the Tokyo Institute of Technology. From 2013 to 2016 he was an assistant professor in the Kawarabayashi Large Graph Project of the National Institute of Informatics. For the academic year 2014–2015 he was a Simons-Berkeley Research Fellow at the Simons Institute for the Theory of Computing. He was an assistant professor in the departments of mathematics and computer science of the University of Toronto until early 2019, before joining Duke University. In the fall of 2018 he was a visiting scientist at the Simons Institute for the Theory of Computing.

His research seeks to quantify the minimum resources required to solve basic problems in combinatorial models such as Boolean circuits. Through creative techniques based in logic and the probabilistic method, Ben has derived groundbreaking lower bounds on the complexity of detecting cliques and determining connectivity in random graphs. His other notable results include size and depth hierarchy theorems for bounded-depth circuits, answering longstanding questions.

Rossman was a Sloan Research Fellow for the academic year 2017–2018. He won the Aisenstadt Prize in 2018. He was an invited speaker at the International Congress of Mathematicians in 2018 in Rio de Janeiro.

== Selected publications ==
- Gurevich, Yuri; Rossman, Benjamin; Schulte, Wolfram (2005). "Semantic essence of AsmL". Theoretical Computer Science. 343 (3): 370–412. doi:10.1016/j.tcs.2005.06.017.
- Rossman, B. (2005). "Existential Positive Types and Preservation under Homomorphisisms". 20th Annual IEEE Symposium on Logic in Computer Science (LICS' 05). pp. 467–476. doi:10.1109/LICS.2005.16. ISBN 0-7695-2266-1. S2CID 18553513.
- Demaine, Erik D.; Mozes, Shay; Rossman, Benjamin; Weimann, Oren (2007). "An Optimal Decomposition Algorithm for Tree Edit Distance". Automata, Languages and Programming. Lecture Notes in Computer Science. Vol. 4596. pp. 146–157. doi:10.1007/978-3-540-73420-8_15. ISBN 978-3-540-73419-2.
- Blass, Andreas; Gurevich, Yuri; Rosenzweig, Dean; Rossman, Benjamin (2007). "Interactive small-step algorithms II: Abstract state machines and the characterization theorem". Logical Methods in Computer Science. 3 (4). arXiv:0707.3789. doi:10.2168/LMCS-3(4:4)2007. S2CID 99659.
- Rossman, Benjamin (2008). "Homomorphism preservation theorems". Journal of the ACM. 55 (3): 1–53. doi:10.1145/1379759.1379763. S2CID 306577.
- Rossman, Benjamin (2008). "On the constant-depth complexity of k-clique". Proceedings of the fortieth annual ACM Symposium on Theory of Computing - STOC 08. pp. 721–730. doi:10.1145/1374376.1374480. ISBN 9781605580470. S2CID 9362397.
- Demaine, Erik D.; Mozes, Shay; Rossman, Benjamin; Weimann, Oren (2009). "An optimal decomposition algorithm for tree edit distance". ACM Transactions on Algorithms. 6: 1–19. arXiv:cs/0604037. doi:10.1145/1644015.1644017. S2CID 7878119.
- Kopparty, Swastik; Rossman, Benjamin (2011). "The homomorphism domination exponent". European Journal of Combinatorics. 32 (7): 1097–1114. arXiv:1004.2485. doi:10.1016/j.ejc.2011.03.009. S2CID 6624366.
- Rossman, Benjamin; Servedio, Rocco A.; Tan, Li-Yang (2015). "An Average-Case Depth Hierarchy Theorem for Boolean Circuits". 2015 IEEE 56th Annual Symposium on Foundations of Computer Science. pp. 1030–1048. arXiv:1504.03398. doi:10.1109/FOCS.2015.67. ISBN 978-1-4673-8191-8. S2CID 7722713.
