= John C. Mitchell =

American computer scientist

John Clifford Mitchell
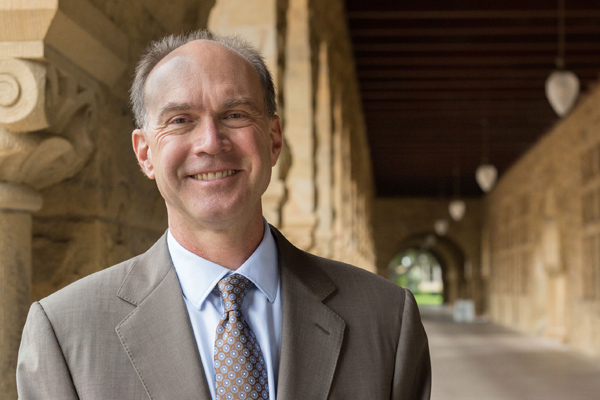
- Scientific career
- Institutions: Stanford University; Bell Labs; Massachusetts Institute of Technology
- Academic advisors: Albert R. Meyer
- Doctoral students: Vanessa Teague
- Website: theory.stanford.edu/people/jcm

John Clifford Mitchell is professor of computer science and (by courtesy) electrical engineering at Stanford University. He has published in the area of programming language theory and computer security.

John C. Mitchell was the Vice Provost for Teaching and Learning at Stanford University, the Mary and Gordon Crary Family Professor in Computer Science and Electrical Engineering at Stanford University, co-director of the Stanford Computer Security Lab, and Professor (by courtesy) of Education. He is a member of the steering committee for Stanford University's Cyber Initiative. Mitchell has been Vice Provost at Stanford University since 2012, first as the inaugural Vice Provost for Online Learning and now in a broader role for Teaching and Learning. Under Mitchell's direction, the Office of the Vice Provost for Teaching and Learning (VPTL) is advancing teaching and learning through faculty-driven initiatives and research, transforming education in Stanford's classrooms and beyond.

Mitchell's first research project in online learning started in 2009 when he and six undergraduate students built Stanford CourseWare, an innovative platform that expanded to support interactive video and discussion. CourseWare served as the foundation for initial flipped classroom experiments at Stanford and helped inspire the first massive open online courses (MOOCs) from Stanford that captured worldwide attention in 2011.

The Office of the Vice Provost for Online Learning was as established in August 2012, after Mitchell served as John L. Hennessy's — Stanford University's 10th President — special assistant for educational technology and chaired a faculty committee that established initial priorities for Stanford and developed intellectual property guidelines for publicly released online courses.

To help build faculty experience and a catalogue of online material, Vice Provost Mitchell launched a faculty seed grant program in Summer 2012. This program has helped faculty across campus transform their Stanford campus courses and release public courses to the world, generating informed discussion and debate among faculty in the process.

In addition to supporting delivery of digital course content, the VPTL engineering team is working to expand the features of Lagunita, Stanford's instance of the open-source release of the edX platform. Mitchell and his team, in partnership with edX, announced the release of Open edX in June 2013: an open-source hosting platform, providing a customizable alternative for all colleges and universities and supporting open educational research and innovation.

Stanford's online courses are generating a wealth of course participant data. In collaboration with Stanford centers of scholarship such as the Lytics Lab, which is jointly supervised by Mitchell, and Mitchell Stevens and Candace Thille of the Graduate School of Education, VPTL is playing a key role in evaluating educational outcomes and improving online learning based on data-driven research and iterative design.

In May 2014, Mitchell's team issued a comprehensive report to share benchmark information with other institutions of higher education.

Mitchell holds a B.S. from Stanford University and a M.S. and Ph.D. from the Massachusetts Institute of Technology (MIT). He has served on the editorial board of ten academic journals, acted as consultant and advisor to numerous companies, and spent sabbaticals at the Newton Institute for Mathematical Science and Coverity, Inc. Mitchell is the author of two books, over 170 research papers, and is among the most-cited scholars in computer science.

== Research ==
Together with Gordon Plotkin he noted the connection between existential types and abstract data types.

Mitchell's early computer science research focused on programming analysis and design, where he played a pivotal role in developing type theory as a foundation for programming languages, a view that is now dominant in the field. For the past 15 years, his research has focused on computer security, developing analysis methods and improving network protocol security, authorization and access control, web security, and privacy.

Mitchell has been at the forefront of Web and network security research and education for more than a decade and has helped train thousands of students in programming languages and hundreds of expert-level professionals in the area of cyber-security. His efforts have resulted in the development of concepts used in the popular Java programming language, improved the security of widely used wireless networking protocols, contributed to the security architecture of the Chrome browser and other components of the modern web.

In August 2012, Mitchell was appointed by Stanford President John L. Hennessy as the Vice Provost for Online Learning, a newly created position responsible for overseeing Stanford's online learning initiatives.
