= Amina Doumane =

Moroccan computer scientist

- Born: 2 September 1990 (age 36)
- Occupation: Computer scientist

Amina Doumane (2 September 1990) is a Moroccan computer scientist who on during 2017 won the French Giles-Kahn prize for the best doctoral thesis in France. Her thesis was on the subject On the infinitary proof theory of logics with fixed points. On 31 January 2018 Doumane was presented with the award by the French computer science society (SIF).

== Research ==
Her doctoral thesis centered around a circular proof system.

== Honours, decorations, awards and distinctions ==
Gilles Kahn prize for best French doctoral thesis, 2017, by the Société informatique de France (SIF).
