= Catherine Meadows =

American cryptographer

Catherine Ann Meadows
- Education: University of Chicago (1975), Ph.D. at University of Illinois at Urbana–Champaign (1981)
- Occupation: Cryptographer
- Employer: Center for High Assurance Systems at the Naval Research Laboratory
- Known for: Developing tools for formal verification of cryptographic protocols

Catherine Ann Meadows is an American cryptographer known for her development of tools for the formal verification and automated discovery of flaws in cryptographic protocols. She is a senior researcher in the Center for High Assurance Systems at the Naval Research Laboratory and the head of the laboratory's Formal Methods Section.

== Education and career ==
Meadows is a 1975 graduate of the University of Chicago. She completed a Ph.D. in mathematics at the University of Illinois at Urbana–Champaign in 1981. Her dissertation, Projections of Varieties, concerned algebraic geometry and was supervised by E. Graham Evans Jr. She was an assistant professor of mathematics at Texas A&M University from 1981 to 1985 before joining the Naval Research Laboratory.

== Recognition ==
A symposium was held in Meadows's honor in Fredericksburg, Virginia in May 2019, and a collection of essays from the symposium was published as a festschrift.
