= ACM Transactions on Computational Logic =

- Discipline: Computational logic
- Language: English
- Edited by: Anuj Dawar

Publication details
- History: 2000–present
- Publisher: ACM (United States)
- Frequency: Quarterly
- Impact factor: 0.625 (2020)

Standard abbreviations
- ISO 4: ACM Trans. Comput. Log.

Indexing
- ISSN: 1529-3785 (print); 1557-945X (web)

Links
- Journal homepage; Online access; Online archive

ACM Transactions on Computational Logic (ACM TOCL) is a scientific journal that aims to disseminate the latest findings of note in the field of logic in computer science. It is published by the Association for Computing Machinery, a premier scientific and educational society on computer science and computational technology in the United States.

The editor-in-chief is Anuj Dawar (University of Cambridge). According to the Journal Citation Reports, the journal had a 2020 impact factor of 0.625.

== See also ==
- ACM SIGLOG, ACM's Special Interest Group on Computational Logic
