= Computational logic =

Use of logic to perform or reason about computation

Computational logic is the use of logic to perform or reason about computation. It bears a similar relationship to computer science and engineering as mathematical logic bears to mathematics and as philosophical logic bears to philosophy. It is an alternative term for "logic in computer science".

Computational logic has also come to be associated with logic programming, because much of the early work in logic programming in the early 1970s also took place in the Department of Computational Logic in Edinburgh. It was reused in the early 1990s to describe work on extensions of logic programming in the EU Basic Research Project "Compulog" and in the associated Network of Excellence. Krzysztof Apt, who was the co-ordinator of the Basic Research Project Compulog-II, reused and generalized the term when he founded the ACM Transactions on Computational Logic in 2000 and became its first Editor-in-Chief.

The term “computational logic” came to prominence with the founding of the ACM Transactions on Computational Logic in 2000. However, the term was introduced much earlier, by J.A. Robinson in 1970. The expression is used in the second paragraph with a footnote claiming that "computational logic" is "surely a better phrase than 'theorem proving', for the branch of artificial intelligence which deals with how to make machines do deduction efficiently".

In 1972 the Metamathematics Unit at the University of Edinburgh was renamed “The Department of Computational Logic” in the School of Artificial Intelligence. The term was then used by Robert S. Boyer and J Strother Moore, who worked in the Department in the early 1970s, to describe their work on program verification and automated reasoning. They also founded Computational Logic Inc.

== See also ==
- Logic programming
- Automated theorem proving
- Type theory
- Formal verification
