= Symposium on Logic in Computer Science =

Computer science and logic conference

The ACM–IEEE Symposium on Logic in Computer Science (LICS) is an annual academic conference on the theory and practice of computer science in relation to mathematical logic. Extended versions of selected papers of each year's conference appear in renowned international journals such as Logical Methods in Computer Science and ACM Transactions on Computational Logic.

== History ==
LICS was originally sponsored solely by the IEEE, but as of the 2014 founding of the ACM Special Interest Group on Logic and Computation LICS has become the flagship conference of SIGLOG, under the joint sponsorship of ACM and IEEE.

From the third installment in 1988 until 2013, the cover page of the conference proceedings has featured an artwork entitled Irrational Tiling by Logical Quantifiers, by Alvy Ray Smith.

Since 1995, each year the Kleene award is given to the best student paper. In addition, since 2006, the LICS Test-of-Time Award is given annually to one among the twenty-year-old LICS papers that have best met the test of time.

== LICS Awards ==
=== Test-of-Time Award ===
Each year, since 2006, the LICS Test-of-Time Award recognizes those articles from LICS proceedings 20 years earlier, which have become influential.

==== 2006 ====
- Leo Bachmair, Nachum Dershowitz, Jieh Hsiang, "Orderings for Equational Proofs"
- E. Allen Emerson, Chin-Laung Lei, "Efficient Model Checking in Fragments of the Propositional Mu-Calculus (Extended Abstract)"
- Moshe Y. Vardi, Pierre Wolper, "An Automata-Theoretic Approach to Automatic Program Verification (Preliminary Report)"

==== 2007 ====
- Samson Abramsky, "Domain theory in Logical Form"
- Robert Harper, Furio Honsell, Gordon D. Plotkin, "A Framework for Defining Logics"

==== 2008 ====
- Martin Abadi, Leslie Lamport, "The existence of refinement mappings"

==== 2009 ====
- Eugenio Moggi, "Computational lambda-calculus and monads"

==== 2010 ====
- Rajeev Alur, Costas Courcoubetis, David L. Dill, "Model-checking for real-time systems"
- Jerry R. Burch, Edmund Clarke, Kenneth L. McMillan, David L. Dill, James Hwang, "Symbolic model checking: 10^20 states and beyond"
- Max Dauchet, Sophie Tison, "The theory of ground rewrite systems is decidable"
- Peter Freyd, "Recursive types reduced to inductive types"

==== 2011 ====
- Patrice Godefroid, Pierre Wolper, "A partial approach to model checking"
- Joshua Hodas, Dale Miller, "Logic programming in a fragment of intuitionistic linear logic"
- Dexter Kozen, "A completeness theorem for Kleene algebras and the algebra of regular events"

==== 2012 ====
- Thomas Henzinger, Xavier Nicollin, Joseph Sifakis, Sergio Yovine, "Symbolic model checking for real-time systems"
- Jean-Pierre Talpin, Pierre Jouvelot, "The type and effect discipline"

==== 2013 ====
- Leo Bachmair, Harald Ganzinger, Uwe Waldmann, "Set constraints are the monadic class"
- André Joyal, Mogens Nielson, Glynn Winskel, "Bisimulation and open maps"
- Benjamin C. Pierce, Davide Sangiorgi, "Typing and subtyping for mobile processes"

==== 2014 ====
- Martin Hofmann, Thomas Streicher, "The groupoid model refutes uniqueness of identity proofs"
- Dale Miller, "A multiple-conclusion meta-logic"

==== 2015 ====
- Igor Walukiewicz, "Completeness of Kozen's Axiomatisation of the Propositional Mu-Calculus"

==== 2016 ====
- Parosh A. Abdulla, Karlis Cerans, Bengt Jonsson, Yih-Kuen Tsay, "General decidability theorems for infinite-state systems"
- Iliano Cervesato, Frank Pfenning, "A Linear Logical Framework"

==== 2017 ====
- Richard Blute, Josée Desharnais, Abbas Edalat, Prakash Panangaden, "Bisimulation for Labelled Markov Processes"
- Daniele Turi, Gordon D. Plotkin, "Towards a Mathematical Operational Semantics"

==== 2018 ====
- Martín Abadi, Cédric Fournet, Georges Gonthier, "Secure Implementation of Channel Abstractions"
- Samson Abramsky, Kohei Honda, Guy McCusker, "A Fully Abstract Game Semantics for General References"

==== 2019 ====
- Marcelo P. Fiore, Gordon D. Plotkin, Daniele Turi, "Abstract Syntax and Variable Binding"
- Murdoch Gabbay, Andrew M. Pitts, "A New Approach to Abstract Syntax Involving Binders"

==== 2020 ====
- Luca de Alfaro, Thomas A. Henzinger, "Concurrent Omega-Regular Games"
- Hiroshi Nakano, "A Modality for Recursion"

==== 2021 ====
- Aaron Stump, Clark W. Barrett, David L. Dill, Jeremy R. Levitt, "A Decision Procedure for an Extensional Theory of Arrays"
- Hongwei Xi, "Dependent Types for Program Termination Verification"

==== 2022 ====
- Josée Desharnais, Vineet Gupta, Radha Jagadeesan, Prakash Panangaden, "The Metric Analogue of Weak Bisimulation for Probabilistic Processes"
- François Laroussinie, Nicolas Markey, Philippe Schnoebelen, "Temporal Logic with Forgettable Past"

=== Kleene award ===
At each conference the Kleene award, in honour of S.C. Kleene, is given for the best student paper.

== See also ==
- The list of computer science conferences contains other academic conferences in computer science.
