= Commission on Federal Election Reform =

American bipartisan organization

History
- Status: Dissolved
- Established by: George W. Bush on 2004

Membership
- Chairperson: Jimmy Carter

Jurisdiction
- Purpose: Election reform
- Policy areas: US Elections

The Commission on Federal Election Reform was a private, bipartisan organization founded in 2004 by former US president Jimmy Carter and James A. Baker, III, a top official under presidents Ronald Reagan and George H. W. Bush, to overcome the flaws brought to light by the electoral uncertainty in Florida in the 2000 United States presidential election and in Ohio in the 2004 election. The commission continued work begun by Carter and former President Ford in a previous commission that studied unusual features of the 2000 presidential race. Its mandate was to examine the electoral process in the United States, bringing together leaders from the major political parties, academia, and non-partisan civic groups to explore how to maximize both ballot access and ballot integrity.

The commission was set up with twenty-one members, including Lee H. Hamilton, former Congressman and 9/11 Commission vice-chair; Tom Daschle, former Senate minority leader; Bob Michel, former House Minority leader; and Betty Castor, former Florida Superintendent of Public Instruction and 2004 Democratic Senate nominee. It set out to spend six months examining the state of elections and to offer recommendations on improving it.

== Recommendations ==
The panel made 87 recommendations in all in its 91-page report. Implementation of all suggestions would require congressional action for some measures, as well as a total expected cost of $1.35 billion. A major point was the commission's call for nonpartisan professional and state oversight over elections. The panel noted that both the 2000 and 2004 elections were marred by partisan, campaign-affiliated officials who held roles in the Bush campaign and Florida and Ohio Secretary of State positions. Because the Secretary of State is responsible for certifying votes, these conflicts of interest were deemed by the panel as damaging to "confidence in elections".

The panel made a variety of other recommendations, including:

- Absentee ballots remain the largest source of potential voter fraud.
- Developing a "universal voting registration system" led by states, rather than local jurisdictions
- Increased voter registration efforts by the states, including an effort to allow ex-felons meeting certain conditions to vote
- Creating a uniform photo identification method to match the voter to the voting roll, while establishing more offices to all non-drivers to more easily register and acquire photo IDs
- Following the Iowa caucuses and New Hampshire primaries in presidential election years, states should hold four regional primaries and caucuses in place of the current schedule in order to reduce the influence of early states in choosing candidates
