= Computer Aided Verification =

Annual conference in computer science

In computer science, the International Conference on Computer-Aided Verification (CAV) is an annual academic conference on the theory and practice of computer-aided formal analysis of software and hardware systems, broadly known as formal methods. Among the important results originally published in CAV are techniques in model checking, such as Counterexample-Guided Abstraction Refinement and partial order reduction. It is often ranked among the top conferences in computer science.

The first CAV was held in 1989 in Grenoble, France. The CAV proceedings (1989-present) are published by Springer Science+Business Media. They have been open access since 2018. The annual CAV Award was established in 2008. The list of recipients and citations can be found at https://i-cav.org/cav-award/.

== See also ==
- List of computer science conferences
- Symposium on Logic in Computer Science
- European Joint Conferences on Theory and Practice of Software
