= Logic in computer science =

Academic discipline

Diagrammatic representation of computer logic gates

Logic in computer science covers the overlap between the field of logic and that of computer science. The topic can essentially be divided into three main areas:

- Theoretical foundations and analysis
- Use of computer technology to aid logicians
- Use of concepts from logic for computer applications

== Theoretical foundations and analysis ==
Logic plays a fundamental role in computer science. Some of the key areas of logic that are particularly significant are computability theory (formerly called recursion theory), modal logic and category theory. The theory of computation is based on concepts defined by logicians and mathematicians such as Alonzo Church and Alan Turing. Church first showed the existence of algorithmically unsolvable problems using his notion of lambda-definability. Turing gave the first compelling analysis of what can be called a mechanical procedure and Kurt Gödel asserted that he found Turing's analysis "perfect." In addition some other major areas of theoretical overlap between logic and computer science are:

- Gödel's incompleteness theorem proves that any logical system powerful enough to characterize arithmetic will contain statements that can neither be proved nor disproved within that system. This has direct application to theoretical issues relating to the feasibility of proving the completeness and correctness of software.
- The frame problem is a basic problem that must be overcome when using first-order logic to represent the goals of an artificial intelligence agent and the state of its environment.
- The Curry–Howard correspondence is a relation between logical systems and programming languages. This theory established a precise correspondence between proofs and programs. In particular it showed that terms in the simply typed lambda calculus correspond to proofs of intuitionistic propositional logic.
- Category theory represents a view of mathematics that emphasizes the relations between structures. It is intimately tied to many aspects of computer science: type systems for programming languages, the theory of transition systems, models of programming languages and the theory of programming language semantics.
- Logic programming is a programming, database and knowledge representation paradigm that is based on formal logic. A logic program is a set of sentences about some problem domain. Computation is performed by applying logical reasoning to solve problems in the domain. Major logic programming language families include Prolog, Answer Set Programming (ASP) and Datalog.

== Computers to assist logicians ==
One of the first applications to use the term artificial intelligence was the Logic Theorist system developed by Allen Newell, Cliff Shaw, and Herbert Simon in 1956. One of the things that a logician does is to take a set of statements in logic and deduce the conclusions (additional statements) that must be true by the laws of logic. For example, if given the statements "All humans are mortal" and "Socrates is human" a valid conclusion is "Socrates is mortal". Of course this is a trivial example. In actual logical systems the statements can be numerous and complex. It was realized early on that this kind of analysis could be significantly aided by the use of computers. Logic Theorist validated the theoretical work of Bertrand Russell and Alfred North Whitehead in their influential work on mathematical logic called Principia Mathematica. In addition, subsequent systems have been utilized by logicians to validate and discover new mathematical theorems and proofs.

== Logic applications for computers ==
There has always been a strong influence from mathematical logic on the field of artificial intelligence (AI). From the beginning of the field it was realized that technology to automate logical inferences could have great potential to solve problems and draw conclusions from facts. Ron Brachman has described first-order logic (FOL) as the metric by which all AI knowledge representation formalisms should be evaluated. First-order logic is a general and powerful method for describing and analyzing information. The reason FOL itself is simply not used as a computer language is that it is actually too expressive, in the sense that FOL can easily express statements that no computer, no matter how powerful, could ever solve. For this reason every form of knowledge representation is in some sense a trade off between expressivity and computability. A widely held belief maintains that the more expressive the language is (i.e. the closer it is to FOL), the more likely it is to be slower and prone to an infinite loop. However, in a recent work by Heng Zhang et al., this belief has been rigorously challenged. Their findings establish that all universal knowledge representation formalisms are recursively isomorphic. Furthermore, their proof demonstrates that FOL can be translated into a pure procedural knowledge representation formalism defined by Turing machines with computationally feasible overhead, specifically within deterministic polynomial time or even at lower complexity.

For example, IF–THEN rules used in expert systems approximate to a very limited subset of FOL. Rather than arbitrary formulas with the full range of logical operators, the starting point is simply what logicians refer to as modus ponens. As a result, rule-based systems can support high-performance computation, especially if they take advantage of optimization algorithms and compilation.

On the other hand, logic programming, which combines the Horn clause subset of first-order logic with a non-monotonic form of negation, has both high expressive power and efficient implementations. In particular, the logic programming language Prolog is a Turing complete programming language. Datalog extends the relational database model with recursive relations, while answer set programming is a form of logic programming oriented towards difficult (primarily NP-hard) search problems.

Another major area of research for logical theory is software engineering. Research projects such as the Knowledge Based Software Assistant and Programmer's Apprentice programs have applied logical theory to validate the correctness of software specifications. They have also used logical tools to transform the specifications into efficient code on diverse platforms and to prove the equivalence between the implementation and the specification. This formal transformation-driven approach is often far more effortful than traditional software development. However, in specific domains with appropriate formalisms and reusable templates the approach has proven viable for commercial products. The appropriate domains are usually those such as weapons systems, security systems, and real-time financial systems where failure of the system has excessively high human or financial cost. An example of such a domain is Very Large Scale Integrated (VLSI) design—the process for designing the chips used for the CPUs and other critical components of digital devices. An error in a chip can be catastrophic. Unlike software, chips can't be patched or updated. As a result, there is commercial justification for using formal methods to prove that the implementation corresponds to the specification.

Another important application of logic to computer technology has been in the area of frame languages and automatic classifiers. Frame languages such as KL-ONE can be directly mapped to set theory and first-order logic. This allows specialized theorem provers called classifiers to analyze the various declarations between sets, subsets, and relations in a given model. In this way the model can be validated and any inconsistent definitions flagged. The classifier can also infer new information, for example define new sets based on existing information and change the definition of existing sets based on new data. The level of flexibility is ideal for handling the ever changing world of the Internet. Classifier technology is built on top of languages such as the Web Ontology Language to allow a logical semantic level on top of the existing Internet. This layer is called the Semantic Web.

Temporal logic is used for reasoning in concurrent systems.

== See also ==
- Automated reasoning
- Computational logic
- Logic programming
