= List of functional programming topics =

This is a list of functional programming topics.

== Foundational concepts ==
- Programming paradigm
- Declarative programming
- Programs as mathematical objects
- Function-level programming
- Purely functional programming
- Total functional programming
- Lambda programming
- Static scoping
- Higher-order function
- Referential transparency

== Lambda calculus ==
- Currying
- Lambda abstraction
- Church–Rosser theorem
- Extensionality
- Church numeral

== Combinatory logic ==
- Fixed point combinator
- SKI combinator calculus
- B, C, K, W system
- SECD machine
- Graph reduction machine

== Intuitionistic logic ==
- Sequent, sequent calculus
- Natural deduction
- Intuitionistic type theory
- BHK interpretation
- Curry–Howard correspondence
- Linear logic
- Game semantics

== Type theory ==
- Typed lambda calculus
- Typed and untyped languages
- Type signature
- Type inference
- Datatype
- Algebraic data type (generalized)
- Type variable
- First-class value
- Polymorphism
- Calculus of constructions

== Denotational semantics ==
- Domain theory
  - Directed complete partial order
  - Knaster–Tarski theorem

== Category theory ==
- Cartesian closed category
- Yoneda lemma

== Operational issues ==
- Graph reduction
  - Combinator graph reduction
- Strict programming language
- Lazy evaluation, eager evaluation
- Speculative evaluation
- Side effect
- Assignment
  - Setq
- Closure
- Continuation
- Continuation passing style
- Operational semantics
- State transition system
- Simulation preorder
- Bisimulation
- Monads in functional programming
- Exception handling
- Garbage collection

== Programming languages ==
- Clean
- Clojure
- Elixir
- Erlang
- FP
- F#
- Haskell
  - Glasgow Haskell Compiler
  - Gofer
  - Hugs
  - Template Haskell
- ISWIM
- JavaScript
- Kent Recursive Calculator
- Lisp
  - AutoLISP
  - Common Lisp
  - Emacs Lisp
  - Scheme
- Mercury
- Miranda
- ML (Category:ML programming language family)
  - OCaml
  - Standard ML
- Pure, predecessor Q
- Q (programming language from Kx Systems)
- Quantum programming
- Scala
- SISAL
- Ωmega
