= Comparison of functional programming languages =

The table shows a comparison of functional programming languages which compares various features and designs of different functional programming languages.

Name	Pure	Lazy evaluation	Typing	Abstract data types	Algebraic data types	Data is immutable	Type classes	Garbage collection	First appeared
Common Lisp	No	Simulated with thunks	Dynamic	Yes	Extension	No	?	Yes	1984
Scheme	No	Yes	Dynamic	Yes	Simulated with thunks	No	No	Yes	1975
Racket	No	Default in Lazy Racket	Strong, Dynamic, statically typed with gradual typing in Typed Racket	Yes	Yes, with Algebraic Racket	Partial	No	Yes	1995
Clojure	No	Yes	Dynamic	Yes	Yes	Yes	No	Yes	2007
Standard ML	No	No	Static	Yes	Yes	Yes	No	Yes	1983
OCaml	No	Yes	Static	Yes	Yes	Yes	Simulated with parametric modules	Yes	1996
F#	No	Yes	Static	Yes	Yes	Yes	No	Yes	2005
Haskell	Yes	Default	Static	Yes	Yes	Yes	Yes	Yes	1990
Scala	No	Yes	Static	Yes	Yes	Yes	Yes	Yes	2004
JavaScript	No	Extension	Dynamic	Extension	Extension	Partial	?	Yes	1995
Clean	Yes	Yes, with optional strictness annotations	Static with uniqueness/optionally dynamic	Yes	Yes	Yes, except for unique types	Yes	Yes	1987
Miranda	Yes	Default	Static	Yes	Yes	Yes	No	Yes	1986
SASL	Yes	Yes	Dynamic	Yes	Yes	Yes	No	Yes	1972
Elixir	No	Stream module	Dynamic	Yes	No	Yes	?	Yes	2012
Erlang	No	No	Dynamic	Yes	No	Yes	?	Yes	1986
Elm	Yes	No	Static	?	Yes	Yes	No	Yes	2012
Futhark	Yes	No	Static	Yes	Yes	Yes	No	Yes	2014
Python	No	Simulated with generators	Dynamic	Yes	No	Partial	?	Yes	1991
Idris	Yes	Yes	Static	Yes	Yes	Yes	Yes	Yes	2007
Nix	Yes	Yes	Dynamic	No	Yes	Yes	No	Yes	2003
Wolfram Language	No	No	Static	Yes	Yes	Yes	No	Yes	1988
Kotlin	No	Lazy delegation and Sequence	Static	Yes	No	Yes	No	Yes	2011
Swift	No	No	Static	Yes	Yes	Yes	No	Swift uses Automatic Reference Counting, which differs from tracing garbage collection but is designed to provide similar benefits with better performance.	2014
Julia	No	No	Dynamic	Yes	No	Partial	?	Yes	2012
PureScript	Yes	No	Static	Yes	Yes	Yes	Yes	Yes	2013
Rust	No	Lazy iterators and external libraries	Static	Yes	Yes	Yes	Yes, through traits	No	2010
Bosque	No	No	Static	Yes	Yes	Yes	?	Yes	2019
D	Optional	Optional	Static	?	Yes	Yes	No	Yes	2001
Gleam	No	Experimental external libraries	Static	Yes	Yes	Yes	No	Yes	2019
