= Schönfinkel =

Schönfinkel (Yiddish: שײנפֿינק(ע)ל Sheynfinkel, Russian: Шейнфинкель Šejnfinkeľ):

- Moses (Ilyich) Schönfinkel, born Moisei (Moshe) Isai'evich Sheinfinkel (1889, Ekaterinoslav - 1942, Moscow)
  - The Bernays–Schönfinkel class (also Bernays–Schönfinkel-Ramsey class)
  - Schönfinkelisation (or Schönfinkelization)
- Miron Konstantinovich Vladimirov, born Sheynfinkel' (Russian: Мирон Константинович Владимиров; 1879, Kherson - 1925) (ru)
- Vera Konstantinovna Schönfinkel Russian: Вера Константиновна Шейнфинкель; (ru)
