= Exportation (logic) =

Rule of replacement in propositional logic

- Type: Rule of replacement
- Field: Propositional calculus
- Symbolic statement: $((P \land Q) \to R) \Leftrightarrow (P \to (Q \to R))$

Exportation is a valid rule of replacement in propositional logic. The rule allows conditional statements having conjunctive antecedents to be replaced by statements having conditional consequents and vice versa in logical proofs. It is the rule that:

$$((P \land Q) \to R) \Leftrightarrow (P \to (Q \to R))$$

Where "$\Leftrightarrow$" is a metalogical symbol representing "can be replaced in a proof with." In strict terminology, $((P \land Q) \to R) \Rightarrow (P \to (Q \to R))$ is the law of exportation, for it "exports" a proposition from the antecedent of $(P \land Q) \to R$ to its consequent. Its converse, the law of importation, $(P \to (Q \to R))\Rightarrow ((P \land Q) \to R)$, "imports" a proposition from the consequent of $P \to (Q \to R)$ to its antecedent.

== Formal notation ==
The exportation rule may be written in sequent notation:
$$((P \land Q) \to R) \dashv\vdash (P \to (Q \to R))$$
where $\dashv\vdash$ is a metalogical symbol meaning that $(P \to (Q \to R))$ is a syntactic equivalent of $((P \land Q) \to R)$ in some logical system;

or in rule form:
$$\frac{(P \land Q) \to R}{P \to (Q \to R)}$$
, $\frac{P \to (Q \to R)}{(P \land Q) \to R}.$ where the rule is that wherever an instance of "$(P \land Q) \to R$" appears on a line of a proof, it can be replaced with "$P \to (Q \to R)$", and vice versa.

Import-export is a name given to the statement as a theorem or truth-functional tautology of propositional logic:
$$((P \land Q) \to R) \leftrightarrow (P \to (Q \to R))$$
where $P$, $Q$, and $R$ are propositions expressed in some logical system.

== Natural language ==
=== Example ===
It rains and the sun shines implies that there is a rainbow.
Thus, if it rains, then the sun shines implies that there is a rainbow.

If my car is on, when I switch the gear to D the car starts going. If my car is on and I have switched the gear to D, then the car must start going.

== Proof ==
The following proof uses a classically valid chain of equivalences. Rules used are material implication, De Morgan's law, and the associative property of disjunction.

Proposition	Derivation
$P\rightarrow (Q\rightarrow R)$	Given
$\neg P \lor (Q \rightarrow R)$	material implication
$\neg P \lor (\neg Q \lor R)$	material implication
$(\neg P \lor \neg Q) \lor R$	associativity
$\neg (P \land Q) \lor R$	De Morgan's law
$(P \land Q) \rightarrow R$	material implication

Due to the use of material implication in the first two steps, this is not an intuitionistically valid proof.

== Relation to functions ==
Exportation is associated with currying via the Curry–Howard correspondence.
