= Associativity (disambiguation) =

Associativity is a property of a mathematical operation.

It may also refer to:

- CPU cache#Associativity, associativity in the central processing unit memory cache
- Operator associativity, associativity in programming languages
- Associativity (linguistics), a grammatical case indicating a person and an associated group of people
- Associativity equation, the equation $F(F(x,y),z) = F(x,F(y,z))$.
