= Bernays–Schönfinkel class =

Concept in first-order logic

The Bernays–Schönfinkel class (also known as Bernays–Schönfinkel–Ramsey class) of formulas, named after Paul Bernays, Moses Schönfinkel and Frank P. Ramsey, is a fragment of first-order logic formulas where satisfiability is decidable.

It is the set of sentences that, when written in prenex normal form, have an $\exists^*\forall^*$ quantifier prefix and do not contain any function symbols.

Ramsey proved that, if $\phi$ is a formula in the Bernays–Schönfinkel class with one free variable, then either $\{x \in \N : \phi(x)\}$ is finite, or $\{x \in \N : \neg \phi(x)\}$ is finite.

This class of logic formulas is also sometimes referred as effectively propositional (EPR) since it can be effectively translated into propositional logic formulas by a process of grounding or instantiation.

The satisfiability problem for this class is NEXPTIME-complete.

== Applications ==
Efficient algorithms for deciding satisfiability of EPR have been integrated into SMT solvers.

== See also ==
- Prenex normal form
