= Clean (programming language) =

Functional programming language

- Paradigm: Functional
- Designed by: Software Technology Research Group of Radboud University Nijmegen
- First appeared: 1987; 39 years ago
- Stable release: 5.0 / 2 July 2026; 2 months ago
- Typing discipline: Strong, static, dynamic
- OS: Cross-platform
- License: Simplified BSD
- Filename extensions: .icl, .dcl, .abc
- Website: clean-lang.org, clean.cs.ru.nl

Influenced by
- Lean, Miranda, Haskell

Influenced
- Haskell, Idris

Clean is a general-purpose purely functional programming language. Originally called the Concurrent Clean System or the Clean System, it has been developed by a group of researchers from the Radboud University in Nijmegen since 1987. Although development of the language has slowed, some researchers are still working in the language. In 2018, a spin-off company was founded that uses Clean.

== Features ==
Clean shares many properties and syntax with a younger sibling language, Haskell: referential transparency, list comprehension, guards, garbage collection, higher order functions, currying, and lazy evaluation. However, Clean deals with mutable state and input/output (I/O) through a uniqueness type system, in contrast to Haskell's use of monads. The compiler takes advantage of the uniqueness type system to generate more efficient code, because it knows that at any point during the execution of the program, only one reference can exist to a value with a unique type. Therefore, a unique value can be changed in place.

An integrated development environment (IDE) for Microsoft Windows is included in the Clean distribution. An extension for Visual Studio Code also exists that integrates with Eastwood, the language server for Clean.

== Examples ==
Hello world:

Start = "Hello, world!"

Factorial:

fac :: Int -> Int
fac 0 = 1
fac n = n * fac (n-1)

Start = fac 10

fac :: Int -> Int
fac n = prod [1..n] // The product of the numbers 1 to n

Start = fac 10

Fibonacci sequence:

fib :: Int -> Int
fib 0 = 1
fib 1 = 1
fib n = fib (n - 2) + fib (n - 1)

Start = fib 7

fibs :: Int Int -> [Int]
fibs x_2 x_1 = [x_2:fibs x_1 (x_2 + x_1)]

fib :: Int -> Int
fib n = (fibs 1 1) !! n

Start = fib 7

Infix operator:

(^) infixr 8 :: Int Int -> Int
(^) x 0 = 1
(^) x n = x * x ^ (n-1)

The type declaration states that the function is a right associative infix operator with priority 8: this states that x*x^(n-1) is equivalent to x*(x^(n-1)) as opposed to (x*x)^(n-1). This operator is pre-defined in StdEnv, the Clean standard library.

== How Clean works ==
Computing is based on graph rewriting and reduction. Constants such as numbers are graphs and functions are graph rewriting formulas. This, combined with compiling to native code, makes Clean programs which use high abstraction run relatively fast according to The Computer Language Benchmarks Game. A 2008 benchmark showed that Clean native code performs similarly to the Glasgow Haskell Compiler (GHC), depending on the benchmark.

== Compiling ==
Compilation of Clean to machine code is performed as follows:

1. Source files (.icl) and definition files (.dcl) are translated into Core Clean, a basic variant of Clean, by the compiler frontend written in Clean.
2. Core clean is converted into Clean's platform-independent intermediate language (.abc), by the compiler backend written in Clean and C.
3. Intermediate ABC code is converted to object code (.o) by the code generator written in C.
4. Object code is linked with other files in the module and the runtime system and converted into a normal executable using the system linker (when available) or a dedicated linker written in Clean on Windows.

Earlier versions of the Clean compiler were written completely in C, thus avoiding bootstrapping issues.

=== The ABC machine ===
The ABC code mentioned above is an intermediate representation for an abstract machine. Because machine code generation for ABC code is relatively straightforward, it is easy to support new architectures. The ABC machine is an imperative abstract graph rewriting machine. It consists of a graph store to hold the Clean graph that is being rewritten and three stacks:

- The A(rgument)-stack holds arguments that refer to nodes in the graph store.
- The B(asic value)-stack holds basic values (integers, characters, reals, etc.). Although these values could be nodes in the graph store, a separate stack is used for efficiency.
- The C(ontrol)-stack holds return addresses for flow control.

The runtime system, which is linked into every executable, builds a Start node in the graph store and pushes it on the A-stack. It then begins printing it, evaluating it as needed.

=== Running Clean in the browser ===
Although Clean is typically used to generate native executables, several projects have enabled applications in web browsers. The now abandoned SAPL project compiled Core Clean to JavaScript and did not use ABC code. Since 2019, an interpreter for ABC code, written in WebAssembly, is used instead.

== Platforms ==
Clean is available for Microsoft Windows (IA-32 and X86-64), macOS (X86-64), and Linux (IA-32, X86-64, and AArch64).

Some libraries are not available on all platforms, like ObjectIO which is only available on Windows. Also the feature to write dynamics to files is only available on Windows.

The availability of Clean per platform varies with each version:

Version	Date	Linux			macOS			Oracle Solaris	Windows		Miscellaneous
Version	Date	IA-32	x86-64	AArch64	Motorola 68040	PowerPC	x86-64	SPARC	IA-32	x86-64	Miscellaneous
3.1	5 January 2022	Yes	Yes	Yes	No	No	Yes	No	Yes	Yes	
3.0	2 October 2018	Yes	Yes	No	No	No	Yes	No	Yes	Yes	
2.4	23 December 2011	Yes	Yes	No	No	No	Yes	No	Yes	Yes	
2.3	22 December 2010	Yes	Yes	No	No	No	No	No	Yes	Yes	
2.2	19 December 2006	Yes	Yes	No	No	Yes	No	Yes	Yes	Yes	
2.1.1	31 May 2005	Yes	No	No	No	Yes	No	Yes	Yes	No	
2.1.0	31 October 2003	Yes	No	No	No	Yes	No	Yes	Yes	No	
2.0.2	12 December 2002	Yes	No	No	No	Yes	No	Yes	Yes	No	
2.0.1	4 July 2002	Yes	No	No	No	Yes	No	Yes	Yes	No	
2.0	21 December 2001	No	No	No	No	No	No	No	Yes	No	
1.3.3	13 September 2000	Yes	No	No	No	Yes	No	Yes	Yes	No	
1.3.2	1 July 1999	No	No	No	Yes	Yes	No	Yes	Yes	No	
1.3.1	January 1999	Yes	No	No	No	Yes	No	Yes	Yes	No	
1.3	22 May 1998	Yes	No	No	No	Yes	No	Yes	Yes	No	
1.2.4	June 1997	No	No	No	Yes	Yes	No	No	Yes	No	
1.2.3	May 1997	No	No	No	Yes	Yes	No	No	Yes	No	
1.2	13 January 1997	No	No	No	Yes	Yes	No	No	No	No	
1.1.3	October 1996	No	No	No	No	No	No	Yes	No	No	OS/2 (i80386)
1.1.2	September 1996	Yes	No	No	No	No	No	Yes	No	No	SunOS 4 (SPARC)
1.1	March 1996	Yes	No	No	Yes	No	No	No	No	No	
1.0.2	September 1995	Yes	No	No	Yes	No	No	Yes	No	No	OS/2 (i80386); SunOS 4 (SPARC)
1.0	May 1995	No	No	No	Yes	No	No	No	No	No	OS/2 (i80386)
0.8.4	11 May 1993	Yes	No	No	Yes	No	No	No	No	No	Experimental T800 transputer release
0.8.3	26 February 1993	No	No	No	Yes	No	No	No	No	No	
0.8.1	19 October 1992	No	No	No	Yes	No	No	No	No	No	
0.8	13 July 1992	No	No	No	Yes	No	No	No	No	No	OS/2 (i80386); SunOS 3–4 (SPARC)
0.7	May 1991	No	No	No	Yes	No	No	No	No	No	SunOS 3–4 (SPARC)

== Comparison to Haskell ==
The syntax of Clean is very similar to that of Haskell, with some notable differences. In general, Haskell has introduced more syntactic sugar than Clean:

Haskell	Clean	Remarks
[ x | x <- [1..10] , isOdd x]	[ x \\ x <- [1..10] | isOdd x]	list comprehension
x:xs	[x:xs]	cons operator
data Tree a   = Empty   | Node (Tree a) a (Tree a)	:: Tree a   = Empty   | Node (Tree a) a (Tree a)	algebraic data type
(Eq a, Eq b) => ...	... | Eq a & Eq b	class assertions and contexts
fun t@(Node l x r) = ...	fun t=:(Node l x r) = ...	as-patterns
if x > 10 then 10 else x	if (x > 10) 10 x	if
