= Moses Schönfinkel =

Russian logician and mathematician

Moses El'evich Schönfinkel
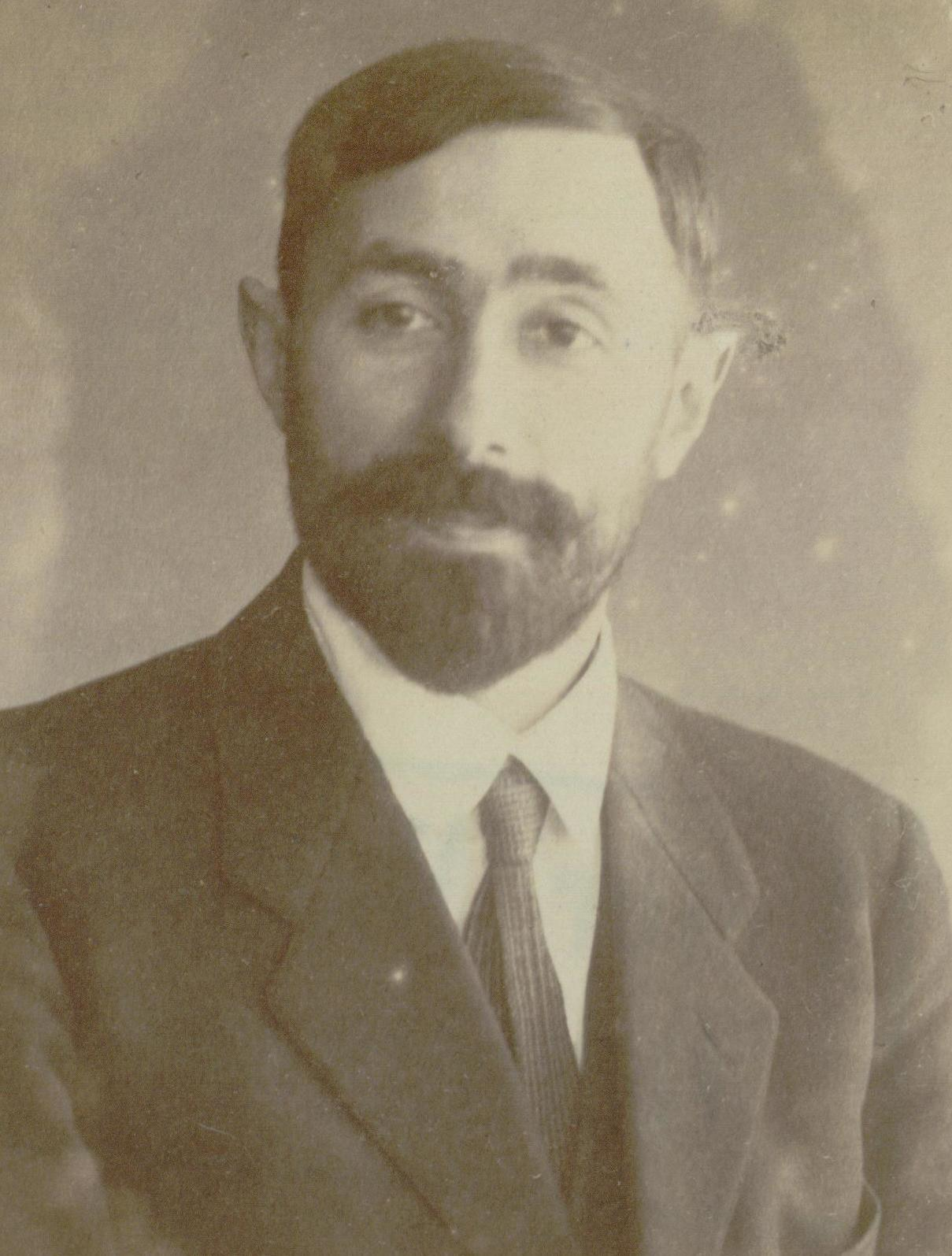
- c.1922
- Born: 29 September 1888; Ekaterinoslav, Russian Empire (now Dnipro, Ukraine)
- Died: 1942 (aged 53–54); Moscow, Russian SFSR, Soviet Union
- Citizenship: Russian
- Education: Novorossiysk University
- Known for: Combinatory logic Technique for binding arguments Bernays–Schönfinkel class
- Scientific career
- Fields: Mathematics
- Workplaces: University of Göttingen

Moses Ilyich Schönfinkel (Russian: Моисей Эльевич Шейнфинкель, romanized: Moisei El'evich Sheinfinkel; 29 September 1888 – 1942) was a logician and mathematician, known for the invention of combinatory logic.

== Life ==
Moses Schönfinkel was born on 29 September 1888 in Ekaterinoslav, Russian Empire (now Dnipro, Ukraine) to a Jewish family. His father was Ilya Girshevich Schönfinkel, a merchant of the 2nd guild, who was in the grocery trade; his mother, Maria “Masha” Gertsovna Schönfinkel (née Lurie), came from the prominent Lurie family. Moses had siblings named Deborah, Natan, Israel and Grigoriy. Schönfinkel attended Novorossiysk University of Odessa, studying mathematics under Samuil Osipovich Shatunovskii (1859–1929), who worked in geometry and the foundations of mathematics.

From 1914 to 1924, Schönfinkel was a member of David Hilbert's group at the University of Göttingen in Germany. On 7 December 1920 he delivered a talk entitled Elemente der Logik ("Elements of Logic") to the group where he outlined the concept of combinatory logic. Heinrich Behmann, a member of Hilbert's group, later revised the text and published it in 1924. In 1928, Schönfinkel had one other paper published, on special cases of the decision problem (Entscheidungsproblem), which was prepared by Paul Bernays.

After he left Göttingen, Schönfinkel returned to Moscow. By 1927 he was reported to be mentally ill and in a sanatorium. His later life was spent in poverty, and he died in Moscow some time in 1942 (aged 53–54) . His papers were burned by his neighbors for heating.

== Work ==
Schönfinkel developed a formal system that avoided the use of bound variables. His system was essentially equivalent to a combinatory logic based upon the combinators B, C, I, K, S and a combinator for a universally quantified nand function which he called U. Schönfinkel stated that the system could be reduced to just K, S, and U (a colleague stated that U could be factored to the end of any expression and thus not always explicitly written) and outlined a proof that a version of this system had the same power as predicate logic.

His paper also showed that functions of two or more arguments could be replaced by functions taking a single argument. This replacement mechanism simplifies work in both combinatory logic and lambda calculus and would later be called currying, after Haskell Curry. While Curry attributed the concept to Schönfinkel, it had already been used by Frege (Note: Willard Van Orman Quine: Introduction to "Bausteine der mathematischen Logik" (Schönfinkel (1967))) (an example of Stigler's law).

The complete known published output of Schönfinkel consists of just two papers: his 1924 On the Building Blocks of Mathematical Logic, and another, 31-page paper written in 1927 and published 1928, coauthored with Paul Bernays, entitled Zum Entscheidungsproblem der mathematischen Logik (On the Decision Problem of Mathematical Logic).

== Publications ==
- Schönfinkel, Moses (1924). "Über die Bausteine der mathematischen Logik" (PDF). Mathematische Annalen (in German). 92 (3–4): 305–316. doi:10.1007/bf01448013. S2CID 118507515. "English translation: Schönfinkel (1967)"
- Schönfinkel, Moses (1967) [1924]. Van Heijenoort, Jean (ed.). Über die Bausteine der mathematischen Logik [On the building blocks of mathematical logic]. From Frege to Gödel: A Source Book in Mathematical Logic, 1879-1931. Translated by Bauer-Mengelberg, Stefan. Cambridge, MA, USA: Harvard University Press. pp. 355–366. ISBN 978-0674324497. OCLC 503886453.
- Bernays, Paul; Schönfinkel, Moses (1928). "Zum Entscheidungsproblem der mathematischen Logik" (PDF). Mathematische Annalen (in German). 99: 342–372. doi:10.1007/bf01459101. S2CID 122312654.

== See also ==
- Combinatory logic
- Bernays–Schönfinkel class
- Currying
