= Graph reduction machine =

Special-purpose computer

A graph reduction machine is a special-purpose computer built to perform combinator calculations by graph reduction.

Examples include the SKIM ("S-K-I machine") computer, built at the University of Cambridge Computer Laboratory, the multiprocessor GRIP ("Graph Reduction In Parallel") computer, built at University College London, and the Reduceron, which was implemented on an FPGA with the single purpose of executing Haskell.

== See also ==
- SECD machine
