= SASL (programming language) =

Purely functional programming language

- Paradigm: Functional
- Designed by: David Turner
- First appeared: 1972; 54 years ago

Influenced by
- ISWIM

Influenced
- KRC, Miranda, Haskell

SASL (St Andrews Static Language, alternatively St Andrews Standard Language) is a purely functional programming language developed by David Turner at the University of St Andrews in 1972, based on the applicative subset of ISWIM. In 1976 Turner redesigned and reimplemented it as a non-strict (lazy) language. In this form it was the foundation of Turner's later languages Kent Recursive Calculator (KRC) and Miranda, but SASL appears to be untyped whereas Miranda has polymorphic types.

Burroughs Corporation used SASL to write a compiler and operating system.
