= List of things named after Stephen Cole Kleene =

The following things are named after Stephen Cole Kleene:

- Kleene algebra
- Kleene Award
- Kleene equality
- Kleene fixed-point theorem
- Kleene hierarchy
- Kleene logic
- Kleene monoid
- Kleene–Brouwer order
- Kleene-Post theorem
- Kleene–Rosser paradox
- Kleene's O
- Kleene's recursion theorem
- Kleene's T predicate
- Kleene star
- Suslin–Kleene theorem
