= Mara Davis =

American radio personality (born 1969)

- Born: July 28, 1969 (age 56); New York City, United States
- Occupation(s): TV and radio host, comedian
- Style: Music, hot topics, celebrity gossip, everyday life, comedy
- Spouse: Mike Kane
- Children: 1
- Website: www.maradavis.com

Mara Davis (MER-ah; IPA [ˈmɛra]) (born July 28, 1969, in New York City) is an American radio personality.

== Biography ==
Davis was born to a Jewish family in New York City. She began her career in 1987 at WMLN-FM, Curry College radio. Upon graduation Davis worked in promotions at WZOU-FM Boston. She was fired, due to budget cuts, in 1992. She moved to Rochester, New York, where she landed a late-night job at WRQI-FM. Davis soon found herself in the same slot in Atlanta at WZGC FM, Z-93. In 1996, she was moved to mid-days where she created the Out to Lunch hour. In 2003, Davis launched the Mara Davis and Dunham Morning Show on Z-93 with co-host Jeff Dunham.

Until recently, Davis was the award-winning mid-day DJ at WZGC 92.9 "dave fm" in Atlanta. Davis hosted a show called Radio Free Lunch where she came up with a daily topic and listeners called and requested songs relating to the theme. The show was a mix of rock n’ roll, talk and interviews. In October 2012 the radio station WZGC 92.9 retired "dave fm" and turned to a 24-hour sports-talk format. Davis was also featured briefly in a season 4 episode of Bravo's Tabatha Takes Over.

== Awards and honors ==
Davis was voted Creative Loafing’s “Best Radio DJ” in 2000, 2001, 2007, 2008 and 2009. She also was honored as “Woman of the Month” by Atlanta Woman magazine in 2004.

== Personal life ==
Davis lives in the Virginia-Highland neighborhood of Atlanta, with her husband Mike Kane and son. Her husband is Catholic.

== Sources ==
- Access Atlanta Article
- Creative Loafing Article
- American Jewish Life Magazine Article
- Mindspring Article
- The Biscuit Blog Interview
- Atlanta Magazine
- The Atlanta Jewish Times Online
- Sunday Paper Article
- Atlanta Magazine
