= Kleene equality =

Equality operator on partial functions

In mathematics, Kleene equality, named after Stephen Cole Kleene, or strong equality, ($\simeq$) is an equality operator on partial functions, that states that on any given argument either both functions are undefined, or both are defined and their values on that arguments are equal.

For example, if we have partial functions $f$ and $g$, $f \simeq g$ means that for every $x$:

- $f(x)$ and $g(x)$ are both defined and $f(x) = g(x)$
- or $f(x)$ and $g(x)$ are both undefined.

Some authors are using "quasi-equality", which is defined like this: $(y_1 \sim y_2):\Leftrightarrow((y_1\downarrow \lor y_2\downarrow)\longrightarrow y_1=y_2),$ where the down arrow means that the term on the left side of it is defined. Then it becomes possible to define the strong equality in the following way: $(f \simeq g):\Leftrightarrow (\forall x. (f(x)\sim g(x))).$
