= Anna Baright Curry =

American educator, founder of Curry College in Milton, Massachusetts

- Detail from a portrait of Anna Baright Curry painted by Frank V. Colson
- Born: Anna Baright; June 19, 1854; Poughkeepsie, New York
- Died: February 1924 (aged 69); Boston, Massachusetts
- Occupation: Educator
- Known for: founding Curry College
- Spouse: Samuel Silas Curry
- Children: Haskell Curry

Anna Baright Curry (June 19, 1854 – February 1924) was an educator and the founder of the School of Elocution and Expression (which later became Curry College) in Milton, Massachusetts.

== Early life and education ==
Anna Baright was born on June 19, 1854, to a Quaker family in Poughkeepsie, New York. Most of her family members were art lovers; the stage actress Julia Dean was her aunt.

After graduating from Cook's Collegiate Institute in 1873, she worked briefly as a teacher in New York state, then taught elocution at Milwaukee Female College. In 1875 she enrolled in Boston University's School of Oratory, where one of her teachers was Alexander Graham Bell. At B.U. she was described by one of her professors as "the greatest woman reader in the country." This was a significant compliment in an era of oratory when speakers such as Charles Dickens and Mark Twain were paid thousands to read lengthy pieces of their work. Baright graduated with honors in 1877.

== Career ==
After graduation she was appointed First Assistant to Lewis Baxter Monroe, Dean of the School of Oratory. In 1879, she and Monroe were planning to open a summer school for oratory on Martha's Vineyard when Monroe died. Rather than cancel, Baright successfully ran the five-week program herself. It was the first summer school of its kind in the country. That fall, Samuel Silas Curry took over the leadership of the Boston University School of Oratory.

Encouraged by Boston University's first president, William F. Warren, Baright started her own school in downtown Boston that fall. The School of Elocution and Expression offered a two-year program modeled after that of the B.U. oratory school. Baright based her teaching on Monroe's principle that "expression is the outward manifestation of that which is already in the consciousness." Professor J. W. Churchill called her "the greatest woman teacher of elocution in the country."

In 1882, Baright married Samuel Silas Curry and became Anna Baright Curry. In 1885, the school was renamed the School of Expression, and Samuel Silas Curry became the head of the school with Anna Baright Curry serving as Dean. Former Boston University School of Oratory professor and telephone inventor Alexander Graham Bell became the school's first chancellor from 1907 until his death in 1922. The Currys ran the school until their respective deaths in 1921 and 1924. Years later, the school was renamed Curry College in their honor.

== Personal life and death ==
Baright and Curry married on May 31, 1882. The couple had six children, one of whom was the noted mathematician Haskell Curry. Baright Curry was a member of the New England Women's Club, the Cantabrigia Club, and the Boston Browning Society. She died in Boston in February 1924.
