= Samuel Silas Curry =

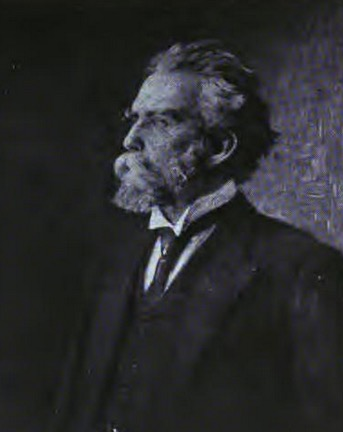
Portrait of Samuel S. Curry by Frank Henry Tompkins

Samuel Silas Curry (November 23, 1847 – December 24, 1921) was an American professor of elocution and vocal expression. He is the namesake of Curry College in Milton, Massachusetts.

== Early life and education ==
Born on a small farm in Chatata, Tennessee, he was the son of James Campbell Curry and Nancy Young Curry, and shared kinship with famed frontiersmen Davy Crockett and Daniel Boone. Growing up on a frontier farm, he learned what it meant to work hard and gained a love of the natural world which would influence his later work. He was a teenager during the tumultuous years of the American Civil War, and experienced hardships when his family's farm was alternately appropriated by both the Union and Confederate armies.

With no school nearby, his early education was received at home. He would work outdoors all day and study at night, reading late into the evenings by the light of the fireplace. His parents encouraged his learning, and shared with him their love of history and literature. As a young man, he left the farm to attend East Tennessee Wesleyan University (later Grant University), where he proved to be an outstanding scholar, graduating in 1872 with the school's highest honors.

He continued his studies at Boston University, where he concentrated on literature, oratory, and theology. At B.U.'s School of Oratory he studied with Lewis B. Monroe and Alexander Graham Bell, then a professor of physiology at the school. In 1878 he graduated with both a diploma in oratory and a Master of Arts degree, and went on to earn his PhD in 1880. In that same year he also received a diploma from Guilmette's School of Vocal Physiology in Boston.

== Career and later life ==
He was planning to enter the ministry, when a sudden loss of voice forced him to embark on a new path. He said of this incident:

One Sunday morning I stood before an audience in the middle of an address, unable to speak a word. The horror of those moments has never been blotted from my memory. The failure was a climax of several years of misuse of my voice, though during that time I had sought help from every available source. I determined to search still more diligently to find the causes of my condition.

Over the next few years he sought advice from many vocal specialists both at home and abroad. In the States he studied with Lewis B. Monroe, Alexander Melville Bell, and Steele MacKaye; he also spent two summers in Europe studying with Emil Behnke, Lennox Brown, Francesco Lamperti, and the famed François Joseph-Pierre Regnier, head of France's National School of Acting. After this extensive study, he had both re-gained his voice and acquired a thorough knowledge of elocution pedagogy. But instead of returning to the pulpit, he chose to become an educator himself. His travels had caused him to realize that he fundamentally disagreed with the prevalent methods of teaching elocution. He was known to say that he “had essayed the systems of forty different teachers, and found them all lacking in different degrees.” This realization led him to embark on his life's work—the establishment of a new method for teaching vocal expression. Curry called his method of instruction that was grounded in principles of psychology the “think-the-thought” method that focused on using the entire body and especially proper breathing technique. Curry “believed that his greatest contributions to students were in his ideas for encouraging positive attitudes toward life and his method for training the mind. He wanted his students to develop a way of thinking that ensured the words, when spoken, would have inner content. Curry saw the art of public reading as superior to acting, based on his belief that understanding the text was crucial to bringing text to life and that the “art of reading...must appeal more than the mind than to the eye.

In 1882 he married Anna Baright, a well-known teacher of elocution and the founder of the School of Expression in Boston. Anna Baright Curry was an educated influential teacher of elocution in her own right, and took rival teacher of elocution Genevieve Stebbins to task in several letters for exploitative and misguided teaching practices which also objectified women's bodies. In 1883 he was appointed Snow Professor of Oratory at Boston University, and in 1884 he became the Davis Professor of Elocution at the Newton Theological Seminary. In 1888 he left Boston University to become the head of the School of Expression, later renamed Curry College in his honor. He taught at the school for the remainder of his career. From 1891 to 1894 he was also an instructor at Harvard University, and from 1892 to 1902 he taught at the Divinity School at Yale. Throughout his life, he traveled widely in order to teach courses at many different institutions, including the University of Washington, the University of Minnesota, the University of Chicago, and the Teacher's College at Columbia University. He also edited the journal Expression, a quarterly review. Samuel and Anna had six children, including the well-known mathematician Haskell Curry.

Samuel Silas Curry died at his home in Boston on December 24, 1921.

== The Curry method ==
Curry's method of teaching elocution (or what today we would call speech or public speaking) emphasized individuality, intellectual engagement, spontaneity, creativity, and rigorous technical training. He developed a system that centered on the idea that all expression comes from within, and that vocal intonation, posture, and gesture cannot be dictated, but must happen naturally as a reaction to genuinely felt emotion. This was in contrast to many elocutionists of his day, who favored mechanistic methods that were rule-based, artificial, and imitative. Curry “believed that his greatest contributions to students were in his ideas for encouraging positive attitudes toward life and his method for training the mind. He wanted his students develop a way of thinking that ensured the words, when spoken, would have inner content” Curry's rejection of the imitative method is evident in his writing:

Action cannot be improved by one human being prescribing a gesture for another. This is the way to destroy all natural and expressive action. Action is personal and must always result from inner activity. It must obey the law from within outward. It must be the effect of an inner condition or experience. It cannot be brought about by laying down rules as to what gestures should be made with a certain class of ideas.

He rejected not only the methods, but also the nomenclature of his field. He felt that the word “elocution” denoted artificiality, and preferred the word “expression” instead. Thus he changed the name of his school, originally the “School of Elocution and Expression,” to simply the “School of Expression.”

But though Curry disapproved of the mechanistic method, he did not entirely abandon these techniques, nor did he wholeheartedly embrace the so-called natural method. Instead, he found a middle ground between the two. His program at the School of Expression encompassed both the psychological and the technical aspects of expression. Students read literature and poetry to stimulate their minds and awaken their emotions, but they also obtained more traditional vocal and physical training, engaging in rigorous technical exercises. Both Curry and his wife, Anna Baright Curry, were vocally opposed to the teachings, philosophy, and methods of instruction made famous by another influential teacher of elocution, Genevieve Stebbins.

Curry was an influential teacher, and many of his students went on to become teachers themselves. Among them were Horace G. Rahskopf, Sara Stinchfield Hawk, Lee Emerson Bassett, Azubah Latham, and Gertrude Johnson. For many years he was librarian of the Boston Arts Club, and was friendly with all the Boston painters of the time.

== Major publications ==
- Classics for Vocal Expression (1888)
- Province of Expression: A Search for Principles Underlying Adequate Methods of Developing Dramatic and Oratoric Delivery (1891)
- Lessons in Vocal Expression: Processes of Thinking in the Modulation of the Voice (1895)
- Imagination and Dramatic Instinct: Some Practical Steps for Their Development (1896)
- Vocal and Literary Interpretation of the Bible (1903)
- Foundations of Expression: Studies and Problems for Developing the Voice, Body, and Mind in Reading and Speaking (1907)
- Browning and the Dramatic Monologue: Nature and Interpretation of an Overlooked Form of Literature (1908)
- Mind and Voice: Principles and Methods in Vocal Training (1910)
- Little Classics for Vocal Expression (1912)
- Spoken English (1913)
- The Smile (1915)
- How to Add Ten Years to Your Life (1915)
