= Curry College =

Private college in Milton, Massachusetts, US

- Former names: School of Elocution and Expression (1879–1885), School of Expression (1885–1943)
- Motto: Rem Tene Verba Sequentur
- Type: Private college
- Established: 1879; 147 years ago
- Endowment: $97.6 million (2020)
- President: Jay Gonzalez
- Students: 4,700
- Undergraduates: 2,100 traditional
- Postgraduates: 1,000
- Other students: 1,650 nontraditional
- Location: Milton, Massachusetts, United States; 42°14′17″N 71°06′59″W
- Campus: Suburban, 131 acres (53 ha)
- Colors: Purple & white
- Nickname: Colonels
- Sporting affiliations: NCAA (Conference of New England)
- Website: curry.edu
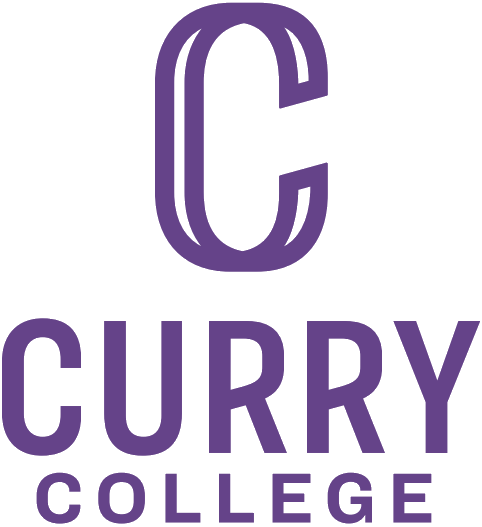

Curry College is a private college in Milton, Massachusetts, United States. Founded as the School of Elocution and Expression by Anna Baright in 1879, in 1885 it was taken over and renamed by Samuel Silas Curry.

== History ==
The School of Elocution and Expression was founded in 1879 on Boston's Beacon Street near the State House by Anna Baright. Baright graduated from the Boston University School of Oratory in 1877 and was described by one of her professors as "the greatest woman reader in the country." This was a significant compliment in an era of oratory when speakers like Charles Dickens and Mark Twain were paid thousands to read lengthy pieces of their work. In 1882, Baright married Boston minister and fellow Boston University alumnus and professor Samuel Silas Curry.

The School of Elocution and Expression had many prominent Bostonians on its Board including Alexander Graham Bell, Alexander Melville Bell, the father of Alexander Graham Bell, legendary Harvard President Charles W. Eliot and author William Dean Howells, who wrote The Rise of Silas Lapham and was nominated for the Nobel Prize for Literature. Among the students in attendance were Smiley Blanton and Sara Stinchfield Hawk, who became pioneers in the field of speech language pathology.

In 1885, the school became the School of Expression and, in 1888, the school was chartered by the state. Silas Curry became the head of the school, and Anna Baright Curry became a professor. Former Boston University School of Oratory professor and telephone inventor Alexander Graham Bell became the school's first chancellor from 1907 to 1922 when Mr. Bell died. Bell, as a professor at Boston University, taught Samuel Silas Curry and, according to the recollections of Curry's daughter, Silas Curry was present when Bell made the first telephone call in 1876. After Mr. Bell's death, Samuel Silas Curry and Anna Baright ran the school until their respective deaths in 1921 and Avenue. In 1932, Curry College relocated to the Bigelow Mansion at 251 Commonwealth Avenue in the Back Bay. In 1932, Curry began a radio broadcasting major, still considered the oldest of its kind in the country. In 1938, the Massachusetts Legislature gave the institution the power to confer the degrees of Bachelor of Science of Oratory and Master of Science of Oratory. In 1943, the School of Expression became Curry College to reflect its founders.

Curry College relocated in 1952 from Commonwealth Avenue in Boston to its current suburban location in Milton, Massachusetts. The college continued to place strong emphasis on communication and self-development but it now became more diversified in its curriculum. In 1953, the college was authorized by the Commonwealth of Massachusetts to confer the Bachelor of Arts and Bachelor of Science Degrees. The first of these degrees was awarded in 1955.

Despite the dramatic change in the school's mission after the 1952 move to Milton, Massachusetts, Curry College maintained its debt to its founders and their scholarship focus that centered on the delivery of words. Curry College sponsors a non-commercial radio station WMLN-FM 91.5 operated by Curry students.

During the 1960s, the growth of Curry was led by President John Hafer, a former Academic Dean at Coe College in Cedar Rapids, Iowa and Dean of Admissions at Syracuse University.

== Academics ==
Curry College offers bachelor's degrees in 28 majors, 7 master's degrees, and an associate of science in nursing. Certificate program is administered through the Continuing Education office. Army and Air Force Reserve Officers Training Corps (ROTC) programs are offered through a cross-enrolled program with Boston University.

Curry College is accredited by the New England Commission of Higher Education.

== Campus ==
Curry's main campus in Milton is 131 acres (53 ha) near the Blue Hills Reservation. The campus is seven miles (11 km) from downtown Boston.

The Milton campus is separated into north and south campuses with the Student Center located in the center of campus. The campus has 19 residence halls with a mix of traditional dormitories, suites and houses. Plans are underway to build a dome-style sports complex and a food court.

=== Student Center ===
The Student Center opened its doors in September, 2009. It replaced the Drapkin Student Center. The 84,000 square feet (7,800 m^{2}) building houses a 5,500 square feet (510 m^{2}) fitness center, a gymnasium, a dining marketplace, a game room, the James P. O'Toole Chapel and multiple meeting rooms and lounges. The mail room, campus bookstore, Disability Services, Conference and Event Services, Residence Life office, and Student Activities office are also located within the Student Center. The Hallways of Champions, located outside of the doors of the gymnasium, showcases trophies and awards of teams and individual athletes throughout Curry's history.

The Curry College Student Center, with its central campus location and wide array of activities, services and spiritual activities including The Newman Club for Catholic students, Hillel for Jewish students and JAM (Jesus and ME) for non-denominational Christians has been the hub of the Curry campus since its opening in 2009.

== Student life ==
Curry has an enrollment of approximately 4,250 students. 2,100 are traditional students from over 31 states and 13 countries. Approximately 1,500 of these students reside in the nineteen residence halls on campus. 1,650 Curry students study in continuing education courses and about 500 Curry students are in graduate school pursuing master's degrees and certificates. Continuing education and graduate students study at either the main Milton campus or the Plymouth satellite campus.

=== Extracurriculars ===
Curry students have created over 40 clubs and organizations. Students are offered the opportunity to create new clubs through the Student Activities Office.

=== Athletics ===
Curry College's athletic teams are nicknamed the Colonels. Curry is a member of the NCAA Division III and participates in the Conference of New England.

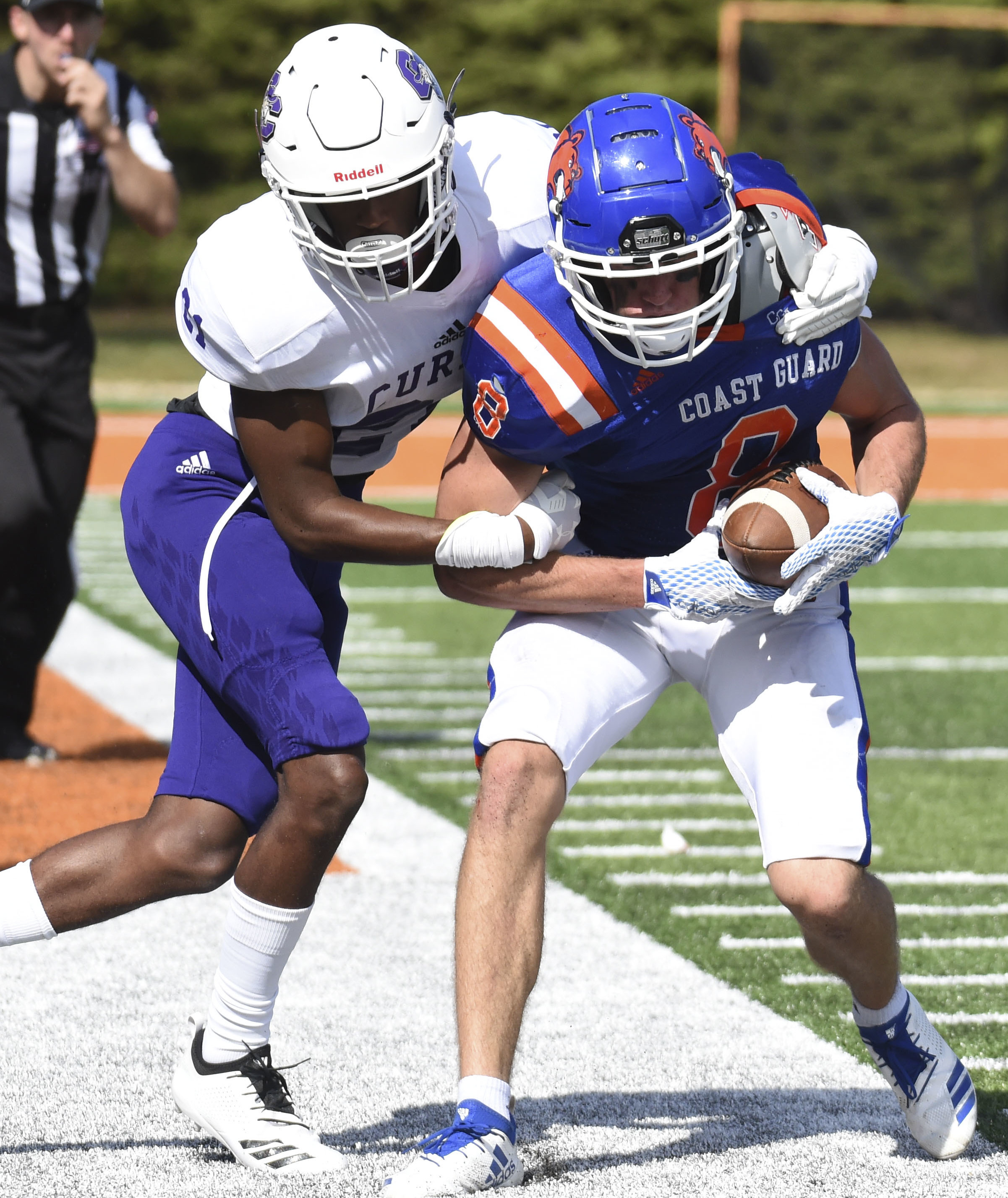
A Colonels football player tackles a Coast Guard Bears football player during a 2019 game

Curry offers baseball, basketball, cross country, football, ice hockey, lacrosse, soccer, tennis, track & field, and volleyball for men and basketball, cross country, ice hockey, lacrosse, soccer, softball, tennis, track & field, and volleyball for women. All sports are played on campus except for hockey, which plays at the Canton Ice House in Canton, Massachusetts.

Curry also has numerous intramural and club sports. The men's rugby club competes throughout New England with other colleges.

The Boston Patriots, now the New England Patriots, used the Curry College football field for its in-season practice facility in 1967 while playing its home games in Fenway Park. During their year at Curry, the Patriots were led by American Football League MVP Jim Nance, Hall of Fame member Nick Buoniconti, and kicker and longtime Patriot announcer, Gino Cappelletti. Heisman Trophy winner Joe Bellino from Winchester and The Naval Academy was also a member of the Boston team, as was Everett High School and Harvard University great, Bobby Leo.

In 2020, Curry announced that they would no longer be using the colonel mascot on uniforms or merchandise. A decision on whether to change the team name is pending.

== Notable alumni ==
- Ken Coleman, professional sports announcer
- Michael Cox, Boston Police Department commissioner
- Mara Davis, radio DJ
- James S. Gracey, Commandant of the United States Coast Guard
- Hal Halpin, president and founder of the Entertainment Consumers Association (ECA)
- Buddy Lazier, winner of 1996 Indianapolis 500
- Marc Maron, podcaster and comedian (attended, but did not graduate)
- Bill McColgan, professional sports announcer
- Jeff Perry, politician
- Jordan Rich, radio talk show host
- Mark Snyder, national radio talk show host and syndicated columnist
- Grace Hyde Trine, writer, lecturer, and dramatic reader
- Ryan Warsofsky, professional ice hockey coach
