= Nels David Nelson =

American mathematician

(Nels) David Nelson, an American mathematician and logician, was born on January 2, 1918, in Cape Girardeau, Missouri. Upon graduation from the Ph.D. program at the University of Wisconsin-Madison, Nelson relocated to Washington, D.C. Nelson remained in Washington, D.C. as a Professor of Mathematics at The George Washington University until his death on August 22, 2003.

== Education ==
David Nelson completed his undergraduate and graduate coursework at the University of Wisconsin-Madison in 1939 and 1940, respectively.

Nels David Nelson
- Education: University of Wisconsin-Madison
- Scientific career
- Workplaces: Amherst College; George Washington University
- Doctoral advisor: Stephen Kleene

Nelson completed his Ph.D. at Madison in 1946. His dissertation, entitled "Recursive Functions and Intuitionistic Number Theory," served as the capstone project for his doctorate. Fellow mathematician Stephen Cole Kleene served as Nelson's doctoral advisor. Nelson, consequently, was Kleene's first doctoral student.

According to the Association for Symbolic Logic:

Nelson's research was in the area of intuitionistic logic and its connection with recursive function theory. He investigated the relationship, in intuitionistic formal systems, between a truth definition and the provability of formulas representing statements of number theory. Kleene had previously introduced the intuitionistic truth definition and arithmetized this truth notion in his definition of realizability of a formula by a number. As a consequence, they demonstrated that certain classically true formulas are unverifiable in the intuitionistic predicate calculus with strong negation.

== Professional career ==
Nelson taught at Amherst College from 1942 to 1946 as an assistant professor. Upon completion of his doctoral studies, Nelson accepted an assistant professor position with the Department of Mathematics at The George Washington University in Washington, D.C., in 1946. Nelson was officially promoted to the position of professor in 1958.

After a decade of service to the university, Nelson received chairmanship of the Department of Mathematics, a position which he held from 1956 to 1967.

== Publications ==
- Nelson, David (16 May 1949). "Constructible Falsity". Journal of Symbolic Logic. 14 (1): 16–26. doi:10.2307/2268973. JSTOR 2268973. "This paper dealt with the issues of constructive logic in relation to intuitionistic truth."
- — (December 1966). "Non-null Implication". Journal of Symbolic Logic. 31 (4): 562–572. doi:10.2307/2269691. JSTOR 2269691.

== Students ==
David Nelson oversaw the dissertation work of the George Washington University student John Kent Minichiello, who authored "Negationless Intuitionistic Mathematics" in 1967. Minichiello received the Ruggles Prize for Mathematics in 1963 for excellence in mathematics under the direction of Nelson.

== Associations and memberships ==
- Member, Executive Committee of the Association for Symbolic Logic, 1949–1953.
- Consultant, National Research Council, 1960–1963.
