= WMLN-FM =

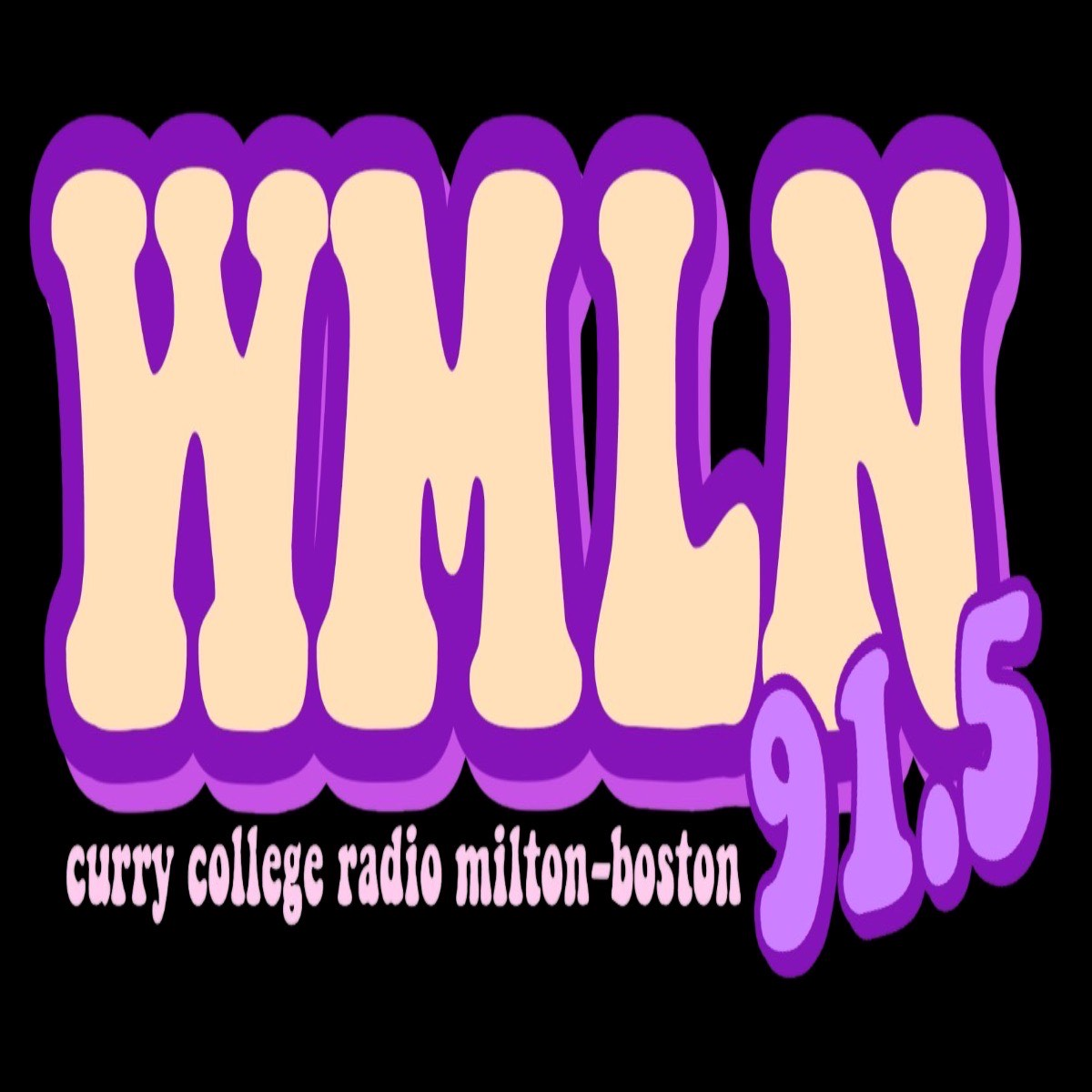
- Milton, Massachusetts; United States
- Broadcast area: Boston, Massachusetts
- Frequency: 91.5 MHz
- Branding: WMLN-FM 91.5

Programming
- Format: Variety
- Affiliations: Westwood One, AP Radio

Ownership
- Owner: Curry College

History
- First air date: April 1, 1975
- Call sign meaning: Milton

Technical information
- Licensing authority: FCC
- Facility ID: 14747
- Class: A
- ERP: 170 watts
- HAAT: 29 meters (95 ft)
- Transmitter coordinates: 42°14′28.4″N 71°6′50.22″W

Links
- Public license information: Public file; LMS
- Webcast: Listen live; Listen live (via TuneIn)
- Website: WMLN Radio www.wmln915.com

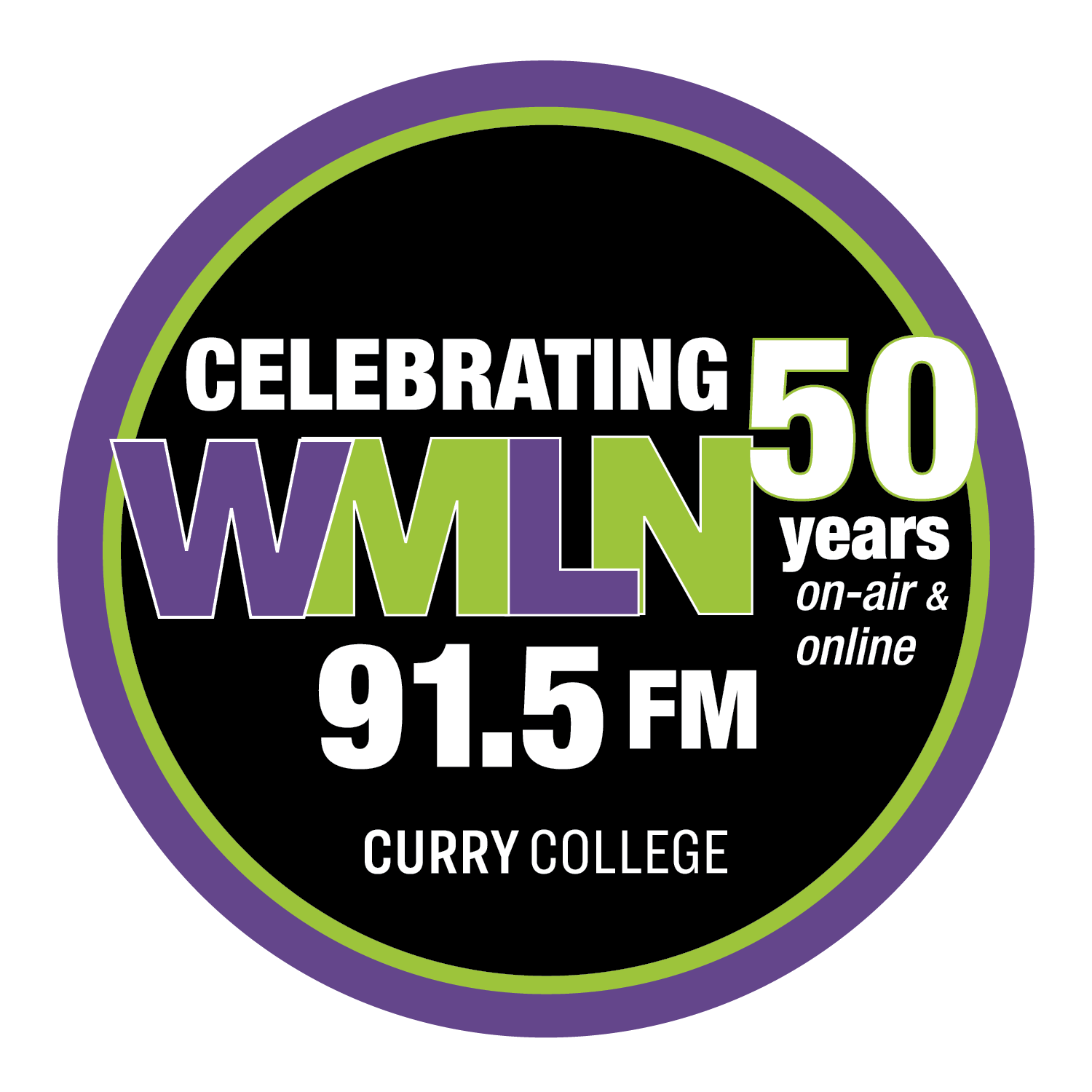
WMLN 50th year logo

WMLN-FM (91.5 FM) is a radio station located at Curry College in Milton, Massachusetts, United States. WMLN is supervised by a faculty member, but is student-run. It broadcasts a college radio block format featuring a variety of music, live talk shows and live coverage of Curry College sports. The station is licensed to serve Milton, and covers the Curry College campus and the Milton-Boston area. WMLN broadcasts continuously throughout the year.

WMLN features programming from Westwood One and AP Radio. From 1968 until 1974, WVAC, the "Voice at Curry", was a carrier-current AM station at Curry College, which later became WMLN-FM on April 1, 1975.

== See also ==
- Campus radio
- List of college radio stations in the United States
