= Haskell Curry =

American mathematician (1900-1982)

Haskell Brooks Curry
- Born: September 12, 1900; Millis, Massachusetts, US
- Died: September 1, 1982 (aged 81); State College, Pennsylvania, US
- Education: Harvard University; University of Göttingen
- Known for: Curry's paradox Currying; Curry–Howard correspondence Scott–Curry theorem B, C, K, W system Combinatory logic Formalism in the philosophy of mathematics
- Scientific career
- Fields: Mathematics; Logic computer science
- Workplaces: Pennsylvania State University; University of Amsterdam
- Doctoral advisor: David Hilbert

Haskell Brooks Curry (/ˈhæskəl/ HAS-kəl; September 12, 1900 – September 1, 1982) was an American mathematician and computer scientist. Curry is best known for his seminal work in combinatory logic. Although its initial concept was based on a paper by Moses Schönfinkel, Curry did much of the development. Curry is also known for Curry's paradox and the Curry–Howard correspondence. Named for him are the programming languages Haskell, Brook and Curry, and the concept of currying, a method to transform functions, used in mathematics and computer science.

== Life ==
Curry was born on September 12, 1900 in Millis, Massachusetts, to Samuel Silas Curry and Anna Baright Curry, who ran a school for elocution. He entered Harvard University in 1916 to study medicine but switched to mathematics before graduating in 1920. After two years of graduate work in electrical engineering at Massachusetts Institute of Technology (MIT), he returned to Harvard to study physics, earning a Master of Arts (M.A.) in 1924. Curry's interest in mathematical logic began during this period when he was introduced to the Principia Mathematica, the attempt by Alfred North Whitehead and Bertrand Russell to ground mathematics in symbolic logic. Remaining at Harvard, Curry pursued a Doctor of Philosophy (Ph.D.) in mathematics. While he was directed by George David Birkhoff to work on differential equations, his interests continued to shift to logic. In 1927, while an instructor at Princeton University, he discovered the work of Moses Schönfinkel in combinatory logic. Schönfinkel's work had anticipated much of Curry's own research, and as a consequence, he moved to University of Göttingen where he could work with Heinrich Behmann and Paul Bernays, who were familiar with Schönfinkel's work. Curry was supervised by David Hilbert and worked closely with Bernays, receiving a Ph.D. in 1930 with a dissertation on combinatory logic.

In 1928, before leaving for Göttingen, Curry married Mary Virginia Wheatley. The couple lived in Germany while Curry completed his dissertation, then, in 1929, moved to State College, Pennsylvania where Curry accepted a position at Pennsylvania State College. They had two children, Anne Wright Curry (July 27, 1930) and Robert Wheatley Curry (July 6, 1934). Curry remained at Penn State for the next 37 years. He spent one year at University of Chicago in 1931–1932 under a National Research Fellowship and one year in 1938–1939 at the Institute for Advanced Study in Princeton. In 1942 he took a leave of absence to do applied mathematics for the United States government during World War II, notably at the Frankford Arsenal. Immediately after the war he worked on the ENIAC project, in 1945 and 1946. Under a Fulbright fellowship, he collaborated with Robert Feys in Louvain, Belgium. After retiring from Penn State in 1966, Curry accepted a position at the University of Amsterdam. In 1970, after finishing the second volume of his treatise on the combinatory logic, Curry retired from the University of Amsterdam and returned to State College, Pennsylvania.

Haskell Curry died on September 1, 1982 (aged 81), in State College, Pennsylvania.

== Work ==
The focus of Curry's work were attempts to show that combinatory logic could provide a foundation for mathematics. Towards the end of 1933, he learned of the Kleene–Rosser paradox from correspondence with John Rosser. The paradox, developed by Rosser and Stephen Kleene, had proved the inconsistency of a number of related formal systems, including one proposed by Alonzo Church (a system that had the lambda calculus as a consistent subsystem) and Curry's own system. However, unlike Church, Kleene, and Rosser, Curry did not give up on the foundational approach, saying that he did not want to "run away from paradoxes."

By working in the area of combinatory logic for his entire career, Curry essentially became the founder and biggest name in the field. Combinatory logic is the foundation for one style of functional programming language. The power and scope of combinatory logic are quite similar to that of the lambda calculus of Church, and the latter formalism has tended to predominate in recent decades.

During World War II, Curry worked at the Frankford Arsenal, where he developed a steepest descent algorithm, based on work by Cauchy. This became a foundational example of modern gradient descent methods.

In 1947 Curry also described one of the first high-level programming languages and provided the first description of a procedure to convert a general arithmetic expression into a code for one-address computers.

He taught at Harvard, Princeton, and from 1929 to 1966, at the Pennsylvania State University. In 1942, he published Curry's paradox. In 1966 he became professor of logic and its history and philosophy of exact sciences at the University of Amsterdam, the successor of Evert Willem Beth.

Curry also wrote and taught mathematical logic more generally; his teaching in this area culminated in his 1963 Foundations of Mathematical Logic. His preferred philosophy of mathematics was formalism (cf. his 1951 book), following his mentor Hilbert, but his writings betray substantial philosophical curiosity and a very open mind about intuitionistic logic.

== Major publications ==
- "Grundlagen der Kombinatorischen Logik" [Foundations of combinatorial logic]. American Journal of Mathematics (in German). 52 (3). The Johns Hopkins University Press: 509–536. 1930. doi:10.2307/2370619. JSTOR 2370619.
- A theory of formal deducibility. University of Notre Dame Press. 1950.
  - A theory of formal deducibility (2nd ed.). University of Notre Dame Press. 1957.
- Outlines of a formalist philosophy of mathematics. Amsterdam: Elsevier Science. 1951. ISBN 0444533680.
- Leçons de logique algébrique (in French). Paris: Gauthier-Villars. 1952.
- Curry, Haskell Brooks; Feys, Robert (1958). Combinatory Logic. Vol. I. Amsterdam: North Holland Publishing Company. ISBN 0-7204-2208-6.
- Foundations of Mathematical Logic. Mcgraw Hill. 1963.
  - Foundations of mathematical logic (Unabridged and corrected Dover ed.). New York: Dover Publications. 1977. ISBN 0-486-63462-0.
- Curry, Haskell Brooks; Hindley, J. Roger; Seldin, Jonathan P. (1972). Combinatory Logic. Vol. II. Amsterdam: North Holland. ISBN 0-7204-2208-6.
