= Robert Feys =

Belgian logician and philosopher (1889-1961)

Robert Feys (19 December 1889 – 13 April 1961) was a Belgian logician and philosopher, who worked at the University of Leuven (Belgium).

Feys was born in Mechelen, and received his PhD in 1909 from the Institute of Philosophy, University of Leuven. In 1913 he was appointed Professor at the Université Saint-Louis, Brussels. But due to the War he enlisted in the Army. In 1919 he was appointed Professor at the Institute St. Gertrude in Nivelles. In 1929 he returned to the Université Saint-Louis, Brussels, and in 1944 he was appointed Professor at the University of Leuven.

In 1958 Feys and Haskell B. Curry devised the type inference algorithm for the simply typed lambda calculus (Combinatory Logic).

== Selected publications ==
- Haskell B. Curry, Robert Feys, and William Craig. Combinatory Logic. Amsterdam, North-Holland Pub. Co., 1958–72. ISBN 0-7204-2208-6
- Robert Feys, Dictionary of Symbols of Mathematical Logic. Amsterdam : North-Holland Pub. Co., 1973, 1969.

French

- Feys, Robert. "Les logiques nouvelles des modalités." Revue néo-scolastique de philosophie 40.56 (1937): 517–553.
- Feys, Robert. "Les systèmes formalisés des modalités aristotéliciennes." Revue philosophique de Louvain, 48.20 (1950): 478–509.
- Feys, Robert. Étude géologique du Carbonifère briançonnais (Hautes-Alpes), 1957. Vol. 6. Éditions Technip, 1963.
