= Stephen Cole Kleene =

American mathematician (1909–1994)

Stephen Kleene
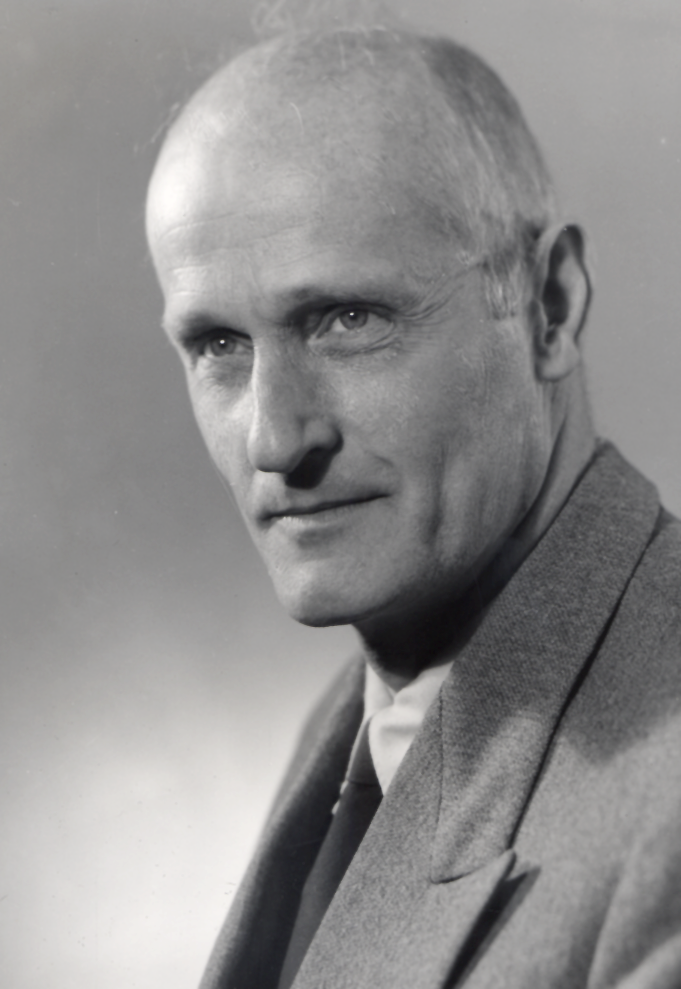
- Born: January 5, 1909; Hartford, Connecticut, U.S.
- Died: January 25, 1994 (aged 85); Madison, Wisconsin, U.S.
- Education: Amherst College; Princeton University
- Known for: Contributions to intuitionism; Kleene–Mostowski hierarchy; Kleene–Rosser paradox; Kleene star; Kleene's algorithm; Kleene's theorem; Realizability; Regular expressions; Kleene's S m n theorem
- Awards: Leroy P. Steele Prize (1983); National Medal of Science (1990)
- Scientific career
- Fields: Mathematics
- Workplaces: University of Wisconsin–Madison
- Doctoral advisor: Alonzo Church
- Doctoral students: Robert Constable; Joan Moschovakis; Yiannis Moschovakis; Nels David Nelson; Dick de Jongh

Stephen Cole Kleene (/ˈkleɪni/ KLAY-nee; (Note: Although his last name is commonly pronounced /ˈkliːni/ KLEE-nee or /kliːn/ KLEEN, Kleene himself pronounced it /ˈkleɪni/ KLAY-nee. His son, Ken Kleene, wrote: "As far as I am aware this pronunciation is incorrect in all known languages. I believe that this novel pronunciation was invented by my father." However, many instances of this surname can be found in the Netherlands and Dutch pronunciation of 'ee' is as ay as in hail, but shorter. Probably, Kleene was aware of that.) January 5, 1909 – January 25, 1994) was an American mathematician and logician. One of the students of Alonzo Church, Kleene, along with Rózsa Péter, Alan Turing, Emil Post, and others, is best known as a founder of the branch of mathematical logic known as recursion theory, which subsequently helped to provide the foundations of theoretical computer science. Kleene's work grounds the study of computable functions. A number of mathematical concepts are named after him: Kleene hierarchy, Kleene algebra, the Kleene star (Kleene closure), Kleene's recursion theorem and the Kleene fixed-point theorem. He also invented regular expressions in 1951 to describe McCulloch-Pitts neural networks, and made significant contributions to the foundations of mathematical intuitionism.

== Biography ==
Kleene was born to Alice Lena Cole, a published poet, and Gustav Adolph Kleene, a professor of economics at Trinity College, in Hartford, Connecticut. Gustav's parents were immigrants from Germany.

Kleene was awarded a bachelor's degree from Amherst College in 1930. He was awarded a Ph.D. in mathematics from Princeton University in 1934, where his thesis, entitled A Theory of Positive Integers in Formal Logic, was supervised by Alonzo Church. In the 1930s, he did important work on Church's lambda calculus. In 1935, he joined the mathematics department at the University of Wisconsin–Madison, where he spent nearly all of his career. After two years as an instructor, he was appointed assistant professor in 1937. In the 1930s, Kleene laid the foundation for recursion theory, an area that would be his lifelong research interest.

He was a visiting scholar at the Institute for Advanced Study in Princeton in 1939–1940. In 1941, he returned to Amherst College, where he spent one year as an associate professor of mathematics. In 1942, he married Nancy Elliott. In the same year he enlisted in the United States Navy Reserve as a lieutenant, attaining the rank of lieutenant commander by his discharge in 1946.

In 1946, Kleene returned to the University of Wisconsin-Madison, becoming a full professor in 1948 and the Cyrus C. MacDuffee professor of mathematics in 1964. He served two terms as the Chair of the Department of Mathematics and one term as the Chair of the Department of Numerical Analysis (later renamed the Department of Computer Science). He also served as Dean of the College of Letters and Science in 1969–1974. During his years at the University of Wisconsin he was thesis advisor to 13 Ph.D. students. He retired from the University of Wisconsin in 1979. In 1999 the mathematics library at the University of Wisconsin was renamed in his honor.

Kleene's teaching at Wisconsin resulted in three texts in mathematical logic, Kleene (1952), (1967), and Kleene and Vesley (1965). The first two are often cited and still in print. Kleene (1952) wrote alternative proofs to the Gödel's incompleteness theorems that enhanced their canonical status and made them easier to teach and understand. Kleene and Vesley (1965) is the classic American introduction to intuitionistic logic and mathematical intuitionism.

[...] recursive function theory is of central importance in computer science. Kleene is responsible for many of the fundamental results in the area, including the Kleene normal form theorem (1936), the Kleene recursive theorem (1938), the development of the arithmetical and hyper-arithmetical hierarchies in the 1940s and 1950s, the Kleene-Post theory of degrees of unsolvability (1954), and higher-type recursion theory. which he began in the late 1950s and returned to in the late 1970s. [...] Beginning in the late 1940s, Kleene also worked in a second area, Brouwer's intuitionism. Using tools from recursion theory, he introduced recursive realizability, an important technique for interpreting intuitionistic statements. In the summer of 1951 at the Rand Corporation, he produced a major breakthrough in a third area when he gave an important characterization of events accepted by a finite automaton

— H. Jerome Keisler (1994)

Kleene served as president of the Association for Symbolic Logic, 1956–1958, and of the International Union of History and Philosophy of Science, 1961. The importance of Kleene's work led to Daniel Dennett coining the saying, published in 1978, that "Kleeneness is next to Gödelness." In 1990, he was awarded the National Medal of Science.

Kleene and his wife Nancy Elliott had four children. He had a lifelong devotion to the family farm in Maine. An avid mountain climber, he had a strong interest in nature and the environment, and was active in many conservation causes.

== Legacy ==
At each conference of the Symposium on Logic in Computer Science the Kleene Award, in honour of Stephen Cole Kleene, is given for the best student paper.

== Selected publications ==
- —— (Jan 1935). "A Theory of Positive Integers in Formal Logic. Part I". American Journal of Mathematics. 57 (1): 153–173. doi:10.2307/2372027. JSTOR 2372027.
- —— (Apr 1935). "A Theory of Positive Integers in Formal Logic. Part II". American Journal of Mathematics. 57 (2): 219–244. doi:10.2307/2371199. JSTOR 2371199.
- ——; Rosser, J. Barkley (Jul 1935). "The Inconsistency of Certain Formal Logics". Annals of Mathematics. 2nd Series. 36 (3): 630–636. doi:10.2307/1968646. JSTOR 1968646.
- —— (1936). "General recursive functions of natural numbers". Mathematische Annalen (112): 727–742.
- —— (1936a). "$\lambda$-definability and recursiveness". Duke Mathematical Journal. 2 (2): 340–352.
- —— (1938). "On Notations for Ordinal Numbers" (PDF). Journal of Symbolic Logic. 3 (4): 150–155. doi:10.2307/2267778. JSTOR 2267778. S2CID 34314018.
- —— (1943). "Recursive predicates and quantifiers" (PDF). Transactions of the American Mathematical Society. 53 (1): 41–73. doi:10.1090/S0002-9947-1943-0007371-8.
- —— (1951). "Representation of Events in Nerve Nets and Finite Automata" (PDF). U. S. Air Force Project Rand Research Memorandum. No. RM-704. The RAND Corporation.
- —— (1952). Introduction to Metamathematics. New York: Van Nostrand. p. 550. LCCN 53001848. OCLC 523942.
- —— (1956). "Representation of Events in Nerve Nets and Finite Automata". In Shannon, Claude; McCarthy, John (eds.). Automata Studies. OCLC 564148.
- ——; Vesley, Richard Eugene (1965). The Foundations of Intuitionistic Mathematics. North-Holland.
- —— (2002) [1967]. Mathematical Logic (Dover reprint ed.). John Wiley & Sons. ISBN 0-486-42533-9. OCLC 523472.
- —— (1981). "Origins of Recursive Function Theory". Annals of the History of Computing. 3 (1): 52–67. doi:10.1109/MAHC.1981.10004. OCLC 4583089.
- —— (1987). "Reflections on Church's thesis". Notre Dame Journal of Formal Logic. 28 (4): 490–498. doi:10.1305/ndjfl/1093637645.

== See also ==
- List of things named after Stephen Cole Kleene
