= J. Roger Hindley =

British logician

- Born: 1939
- Education: Queen's University Belfast
- Known for: Hindley–Milner type inference algorithm
- Scientific career
- Fields: Logic, Type theory
- Workplaces: Swansea University
- Doctoral advisor: Ronald Harrop

J. Roger Hindley is a prominent British logician best known for the Hindley–Milner type inference algorithm. Since 1998, he has been an Honorary Research Fellow at Swansea University.

== Education ==
Hindley graduated in 1960 from Queen's University Belfast, remaining to earn an M.Sc. in 1961.

He went on to receive a Ph.D. in 1964 from the University of Newcastle upon Tyne, where his thesis supervisor was Ronald Harrop. Later, he returned to Queen's University for a D.Sc. in 1991.

He taught at Penn State University (1964–1966), Bristol University (1966–1968), and has been at Swansea University since 1968.

== Selected publications ==
- Hindley, J. Roger (1969), "The principal type-scheme of an object in combinatory logic", Transactions of the American Mathematical Society, 146: 29–60, doi:10.2307/1995158, JSTOR 1995158, MR 0253905.
- Hindley, J. Roger (2008), Basic simple type theory (2nd ed.), Cambridge University Press, ISBN 9780521054225.
