= Grid cell topology =

The grid cell topology is studied in digital topology as part of the theoretical basis for (low-level) algorithms in computer image analysis or computer graphics.

The elements of the n-dimensional grid cell topology (n ≥ 1) are all n-dimensional grid cubes and their k-dimensional faces (for 0 ≤ k ≤ n−1); between these a partial order A ≤ B is defined if A is a subset of B (and thus also dim(A) ≤ dim(B)). The grid cell topology is the Alexandrov topology (open sets are up-sets) with respect to this partial order. (See also poset topology.)

Alexandrov and Hopf first introduced the grid cell topology, for the two-dimensional case, within an exercise in their text Topologie I (1935).

A recursive method to obtain n-dimensional grid cells and an intuitive definition for grid cell manifolds can be found in Chen, 2004. It is related to digital manifolds.

== See also ==
- Pixel connectivity
