= Combinatorial topology =

Mathematical subject

In mathematics, combinatorial topology was an older name for algebraic topology, dating from the time when topological invariants of spaces (for example the Betti numbers) were regarded as derived from combinatorial decompositions of spaces, such as decomposition into simplicial complexes. After the proof of the simplicial approximation theorem this approach provided rigour.

The change of name reflected the move to organise topological classes such as cycles-modulo-boundaries explicitly into abelian groups. This point of view is often attributed to Emmy Noether, and so the change of title may reflect her influence. The transition is also attributed to the work of Heinz Hopf, who was influenced by Noether, and to Leopold Vietoris and Walther Mayer, who independently defined homology.

A fairly precise date can be supplied in the internal notes of the Bourbaki group. While this kind of topology was still "combinatorial" in 1942, it had become "algebraic" by 1944. This corresponds also to the period where homological algebra and category theory were introduced for the study of topological spaces, and largely supplanted combinatorial methods.

More recently the term combinatorial topology has been revived for investigations carried out by treating topological objects as composed of pieces as in the older combinatorial topology, which is again found useful.

Azriel Rosenfeld (1973) proposed digital topology for a type of image processing that can be considered as a new development of combinatorial topology. The digital forms of the Euler characteristic theorem and the Gauss–Bonnet theorem were obtained by Li Chen and Yongwu Rong. A 2D grid cell topology already appeared in the Alexandrov–Hopf book Topologie I (1935).

Gottfried Wilhelm Leibniz had envisioned a form of combinatorial topology as early as 1679 in his work Characteristica Geometrica.

== See also ==
- Hauptvermutung
- Topological combinatorics
- Topological graph theory
