= Gradually varied surface =

Type of digital surface

In mathematics, a gradually varied surface is a special type of digital surfaces. It is a function from a 2D digital space (see digital geometry) to an ordered set or a chain.

A gradually varied function is a function from a digital space $\Sigma$ to $\{ A_1,\dots,A_m \}$ where $A_1< \cdots <A_m$ and $A_i$ are real numbers. This function possesses the following property: If x and y are two adjacent points in $\Sigma$, assume $f(x)=A_{i}$, then $f(y)=A_{i}$, $f(x)=A_{i+1}$, or $A_{i-1}$.

The concept of the continuous function in digital space (can be called digitally continuous functions) was proposed by Azriel Rosenfeld in 1986. It is a function in which the value (an integer) at a digital point is the same or almost the same as its neighbors. In other words, if x and y are two adjacent points in a digital space, |f(x) − f(y)| ≤ 1.

So we can see that the gradually varied function is defined to be more general than the digitally continuous function. The gradually varied function was defined by L. Chen in 1989.

An extension theorem related to above functions was mentioned by Rosenfeld (1986) and completed by Chen (1989). This theorem states: Let $D \subset \Sigma$ and $f: D\rightarrow \{ A_1, \dots,A_m \}$. The necessary and sufficient condition for the existence of the gradually varied extension $F$ of $f$ is : for each pair of points $x$ and $y$ in $D$, assume $f(x)=A_i$ and $f(y)=A_j$, we have $|i-j|\le d(x,y)$, where $d(x,y)$ is the (digital) distance between $x$ and $y$.

The gradually varied surface has direct relationship to graph homomorphism.
