= Pietikäinen =

Pietikäinen is a Finnish surname. Notable people with the surname include:

- Aatto Pietikäinen (1921–1966), Finnish ski jumper
- Jukka Pietikäinen (born 1956), Finnish diplomat
- Matti Pietikäinen (1927–1967), Finnish ski jumper, brother of Aatto
- Matti Pietikäinen (academic), Finnish computer scientist
- Sirpa Pietikäinen (1959-), Finnish politician

== See also ==
- Pietiläinen
- Pietilä
