= Nasser Kehtarnavaz =

Nasser Kehtarnavaz is an Erik Jonsson Distinguished Professor at the University of Texas at Dallas, Richardson, TX, and Editor-in-Chief of Springer Journal of Real-Time Image Processing. His research and educational contributions are in the areas of signal and image processing, real-time implementation on embedded processors, machine learning, and biomedical image analysis. He has published over 10 books and numerous technical articles in these areas. He has pioneered and introduced several novel approaches addressing practical implementation aspects of signal processing concepts. In his latest contribution, he has introduced a mobile and open platform approach based on smartphones for signal processing and signals and systems laboratory courses. Dr. Kehtarnavaz is a Fellow of IEEE, a Fellow of SPIE, and a licensed Professional Engineer.
