= 4-connected =

4-connected may refer to:

- 4-connected neighborhood in computer graphics
- 4-connected graph, in graph theory
