= Pietilä =

Pietilä is a Finnish surname. Notable people with the surname include:

- Pekka Ala-Pietilä (born 1957), Finnish businessman
- Bonita Pietila (born 1953), American casting director and producer for The Simpsons
- Maria Pietilä Holmner (born 1986), Swedish alpine skier
- Reima Pietilä (1923–1993), Finnish architect and professor
- Raili Pietilä (1926–2021), Finnish architect
- Tuulikki Pietilä (1917–2009), Finnish graphic artist and professor

== See also ==
- Pietikäinen
- Pietiläinen
