= Pietiläinen =

Pietiläinen is a Finnish surname. It is a Patronymic surname derived from the archaic Finnish given name Pieti, 'Peter'. Notable people with the surname include:

- Pauli Pietiläinen, Finnish concert organist
- Sauli Pietiläinen (born 1941), Finnish footballer
- Yelena Pietiläinen (born 1961), Russian poet, writer, and educator

== See also ==
- Pietikäinen
- Pietilä
- Pietinen
