= Jinhong K. Guo =

Chinese-American computer scientist

Jinhong Katherine Guo is a Chinese and American computer scientist and signal processing and image processing researcher at the Lockheed Martin Advanced Technology Laboratories.

== Education and career ==
After undergraduate studies at Tsinghua University, Guo received a master's degree from Northeastern University and in 1996 began working as a research scientist for Panasonic. While doing so she continued her studies at the University of Maryland, College Park, where she completed her Ph.D. in 2000 under the supervision of Azriel Rosenfeld.

By 2012 she had moved from Panasonic to Lockheed Martin. She is a member of the editorial board of the International Journal of Pattern Recognition and Artificial Intelligence.

== Recognition ==
Guo's paper "Extracting meaningful entities from human-generated tactical reports" with David Van Brackle, Nicolas LoFaso, and Martin O. Hofmann won the Best Paper Award at Complex Adaptive Systems 2015.

She was named as an IEEE Fellow in 2026, "for contributions to signal processing and trust in secure communication systems".
