= Pietinen =

Pietinen is a Finnish surname. Notable people with the surname include:

- Matti Pietinen (1859–1918), Finnish politician
- Mikko Pietinen, Finnish musician from Mannhai
- Otso Pietinen (1916–1993), Finnish photographer
- Seppo Pietinen, Finnish diplomat and lawyer

== See also ==
- Pietiläinen
