= Azriel Rosenfeld =

American computer scientist (1931–2004)

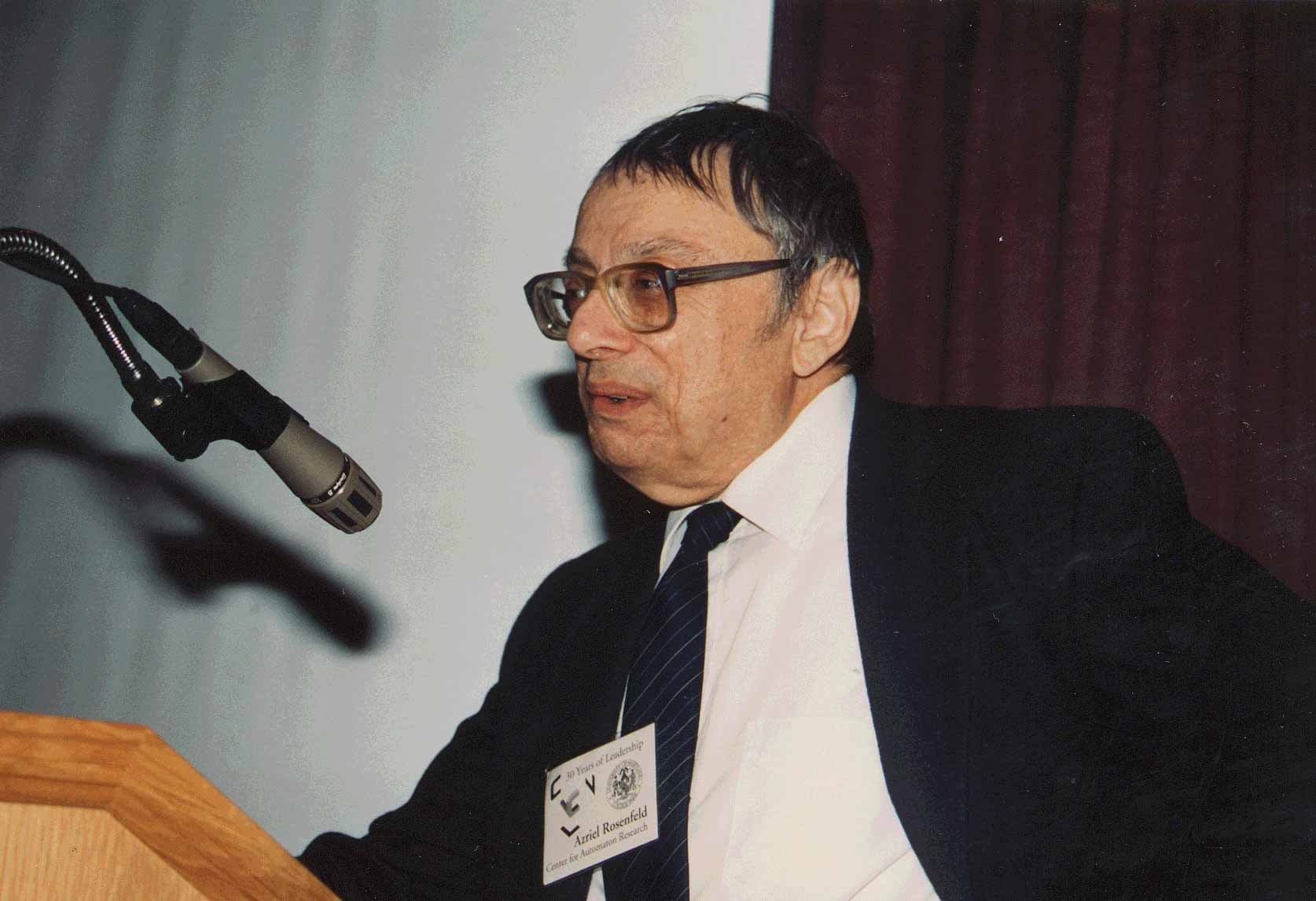
- Born: February 19, 1931
- Died: February 22, 2004 (aged 73)
- Education: Columbia University
- Known for: Pioneering contributions to digital image analysis Azriel Rosenfeld Award
- Awards: IEEE Emanuel R. Piore Award (1985); King-Sun Fu Prize (1988); Norbert Wiener Award of the IEEE (1995)
- Scientific career
- Fields: Computer Science
- Workplaces: University of Maryland, College Park
- Doctoral advisor: Ellis Kolchin
- Doctoral students: Narendra Ahuja; Larry Davis; David S. Doermann; Jinhong K. Guo; Matti Pietikäinen; Angela Y. Wu

Azriel Rosenfeld (February 19, 1931 – February 22, 2004) was an American Research Professor, a Distinguished University Professor, and Director of the Center for Automation Research at the University of Maryland, College Park, Maryland, where he also held affiliate professorships in the Departments of Computer Science, Electrical Engineering, and Psychology. He was a leading researcher in the field of computer image analysis. Over a period of nearly 40 years, he made many fundamental and pioneering contributions to nearly every area of that field. He wrote the first textbook in the field (1969); was founding editor of its first journal, Computer Graphics and Image Processing (1972); and was co-chairman of its first international conference (1987). He published over 30 books and over 600 book chapters and journal articles, and directed nearly 60 Ph.D. dissertations.

Rosenfeld's research on digital image analysis (specifically on digital geometry and digital topology, and on the accurate measurement of statistical features of digital images) in the 1960s and 1970s formed the foundation for a generation of industrial vision inspection systems that have found widespread applications from the automotive to the electronics industry.

He held a Ph.D. in mathematics from Columbia University (1957), Rabbinic ordination (1952) and a Doctorate of Hebrew Literature (1955) from Yeshiva University. He also received honorary Doctorate of Technology degrees from Linkoping University (1980) and Oulu University (1994), and an honorary Doctorate of Humane Letters degree from Yeshiva University (2000). He was also awarded an honorary Doctorate of Science degree from the Technion (2004, conferred posthumously). He was a Fellow of the Association for the Advancement of Artificial Intelligence (1990) and of the Association for Computing Machinery (1994).

Rosenfeld was a ba'al koreh (Torah Reader) at Young Israel Shomrai Emunah of Greater Washington for many years until he moved to Baltimore in 2001.

In honor of the memory of Rosenfeld, the International Conference on Computer Vision (ICCV) gives the biennial Azriel Rosenfeld Award to a living person in the recognition of an outstanding life-time contribution to the field of image understanding or computer vision.

== Lectures ==
- 1992 - Perspectives on computer vision Lecture sponsored by the Dept. of Electrical and Computer engineering, University of California, San Diego. Electrical and Computer Engineering Distinguished Lecture Series. Digital object made available by UC San Diego Library.
