= David Doermann =

American computer scientist

David S. Doermann
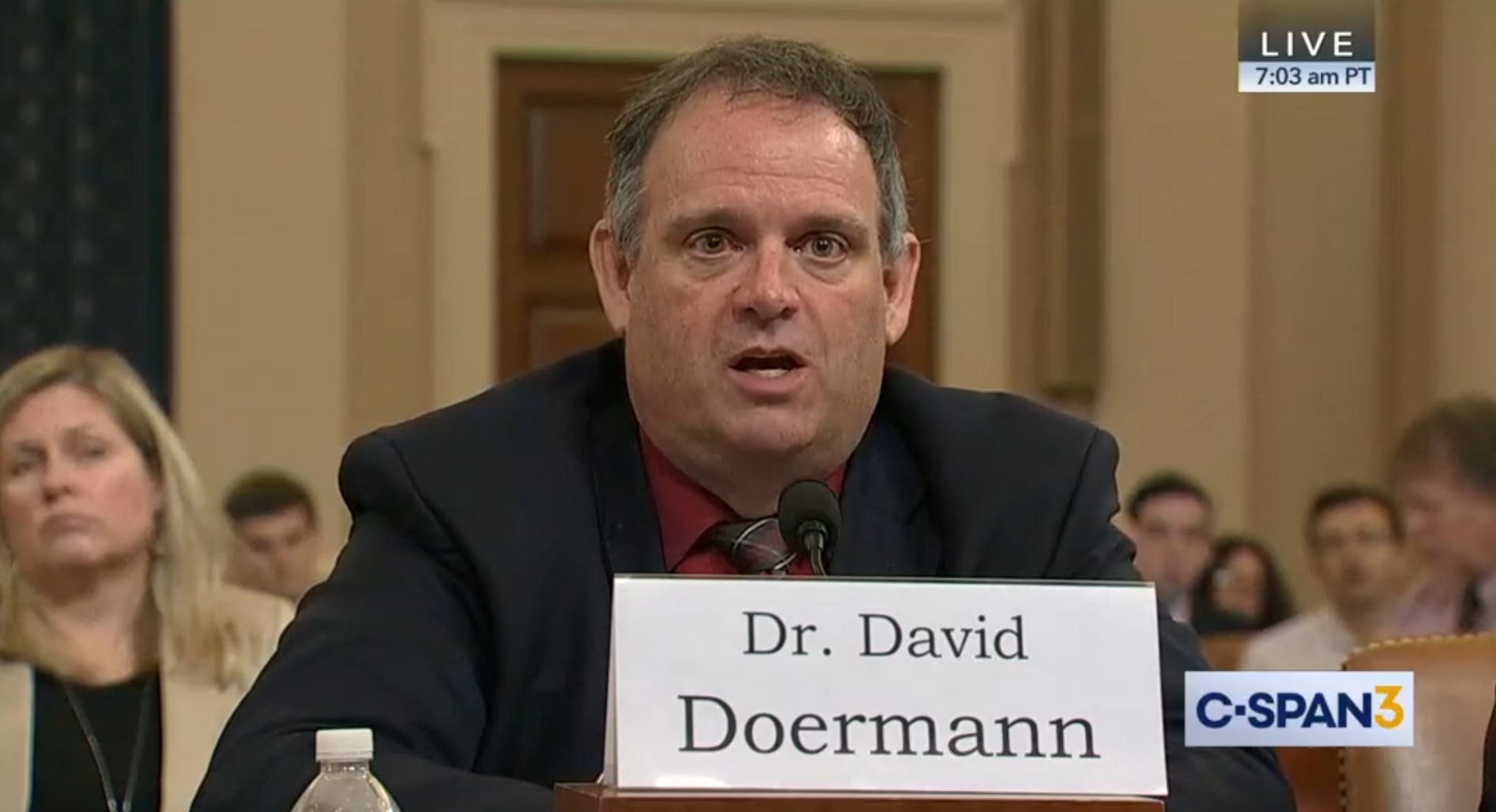

SUNY Empire Innovation Professor at the University at Buffalo

Personal details
- Born: 1965 (age 60–61) United States of America
- Education: University of Maryland, College Park; Bloomsburg University of Pennsylvania
- Occupation: Professor, SUNY Empire Innovation
- Profession: Computer Science
- Awards: Honorary doctorate from the University of Oulu, Finland; Fellow of the IEEE; Fellow of the IAPR
- Website: https://cse.buffalo.edu/~doermann/
- Scientific career
- Fields: Computer Science; Pattern Recognition; Computer Vision; Document Analysis; Artificial Intelligence
- Workplaces: University at Buffalo; DARPA; University of Maryland
- Doctoral advisor: Azriel Rosenfeld

David S. Doermann (born 1965) is an American computer science researcher and professor in the areas of document analysis, computer vision, and artificial intelligence.

== Education ==
Doermann received a B.Sc. degree in computer science and mathematics from Bloomsburg University, Bloomsburg, PA in 1987, a M.Sc. and Ph.D. degrees from the University of Maryland, College Park, MD, in 1989 and 1993, respectively.

== Career ==
Doermann is a SUNY Empire Innovation Professor and current Chair in the Department of Computer Science and Engineering, University at Buffalo and the Inaugural Director of the University at Buffalo Artificial Intelligence Institute. He was a Research Scientist at the University of Maryland from 1993 to 2018 where he was a member of UMIACS and the Director of the Laboratory for Language and Media Processing (LAMP). From 2014 to 2018, he was a program manager at the Defense Advanced Research Projects Agency (DARPA), where he ran programs related to human language technologies, including the media forensics (Medifor) program.

Doermann is a founding co-editor of the International Journal on Document Analysis and Recognition. In 2013, he was one of the executive chairs of the International Conference on Document Analysis and Recognition. In 2019, he was appointed as the SUNY representative of the State of New York Governors Commission on Artificial Intelligence, Robotics, and Automation.

== Honors and awards ==
In 2014 Doermann became both an IEEE Fellow, and a Fellow of the IAPR. In 2017 he received the Award for Excellence from the Under Secretary of Defense (Acquisition, Technology, and Logistics) for support and transition of key technology to deployed troops. In 2016, he received the Results Matter award presented to a program manager by the Director of DARPA for successful program development, implementation, and transition that exemplifies the DARPA mission of preventing strategic surprise. From 2011 to 2013, he was awarded a Distinguished Visiting Fellowship, at the University of Salford, Manchester UK, from the Royal Academy of Engineering for work on practical systems for mass-digitization using cloud computing. In 2002, he received an Honorary Doctorate of Technology Sciences from the University of Oulu for contributions to digital media processing and document analysis research.

== Personal life ==
Doermann sits on the boards of directors of Bethania Kids.

He has been married since 1988 and has three daughters.
