= Matti Pietikäinen (academic) =

Finnish computer scientist

Matti Kalevi Pietikäinen
- Education: University of Oulu
- Known for: Fundamental contributions to texture analysis and facial image analysis
- Awards: IEEE Fellow; IAPR Fellow; AAIA Fellow; Pentti Kaitera Prize; IET Journal's Premium Award; Koenderink Prize; King-Sun Fu Prize; Highly Cited Researcher; Highly Cited Researcher whose h-index is at least 100 in Google Scholar
- Scientific career
- Fields: Computer vision, Pattern recognition
- Workplaces: University of Oulu, Center for Machine Vision and Signal Analysis
- Doctoral advisor: Azriel Rosenfeld

Matti Kalevi Pietikäinen is a Finnish computer scientist. He is currently Professor (emer.) in the Center for Machine Vision and Signal Analysis, University of Oulu. His research interests are in texture-based computer vision, face analysis, affective computing, biometrics, and vision-based perceptual interfaces. He was Director of the Center for Machine Vision Research, and Scientific Director of Infotech Oulu.

== Biography ==
Pietikäinen received the Doctor of Science in Technology degree from University of Oulu, Finland, in 1982. From 1980 to 1981 and from 1984 to 1985 he was with the Computer Vision Laboratory at the University of Maryland, working with a pioneer of the computer image analysis, Professor Azriel Rosenfeld. After the first visit, he established computer vision research at University of Oulu. For the 25th Anniversary book of his group in Oulu, see the list of selected publications.

He has authored over 350 refereed scientific publications, which have been frequently cited. He has made pioneering contributions to local binary patterns (LBP) methodology, texture-based image and video analysis, and facial image analysis.

He has been Associate Editor of IEEE Transactions on Pattern Analysis and Machine Intelligence (TPAMI), Pattern Recognition, IEEE Transactions on Forensics and Security, Image and Vision Computing, and IEEE Transactions on Biometrics, Behavior and Identity Science. He has also been Guest Editor for several special issues, including IEEE TPAMI and International Journal of Computer Vision.

In 2011, he was named an IEEE Fellow for his contributions to texture and facial image analysis for machine vision. Already in 1994, he received the IAPR Fellow nomination for contributions to machine vision and its applications in industry and service to the IAPR In 2018, he received the IAPR's King-Sun Fu Prize for fundamental contributions to texture analysis and facial image analysis. He was named a Highly Cited Researcher by Clarivate Analytics in 2018. Since February 2023 he will be listed by Webometrics among the Highly Cited Researchers whose h-index is at least 100. In 2024 he was invited to be Fellow of Asia-Pacific Artificial Intelligence Association (AAIA). For a short book on his whole career, see Selected publications.

== Selected publications ==
- Ojala, T.; Pietikäinen, M.; Harwood, D. (1996). "A comparative study of texture measures with classification based on feature distributions". Pattern Recognition. 29 (1): 51–59. Bibcode:1996PatRe..29...51O. doi:10.1016/0031-3203(95)00067-4.
- Sauvola, J.; Pietikäinen, M. (2000). "Adaptive document image binarization". Pattern Recognition. 33 (2): 225–236. Bibcode:2000PatRe..33..225S. doi:10.1016/S0031-3203(99)00055-2. hdl:10338.dmlcz/145819.
- Ojala, T.; Pietikäinen, M.; Mäenpää, T. (2002). "Multiresolution gray-scale and rotation invariant texture classification with local binary patterns". IEEE Transactions on Pattern Analysis and Machine Intelligence. 24 (7): 971–987. CiteSeerX 10.1.1.157.1576. doi:10.1109/tpami.2002.1017623. S2CID 14540685.
- Heikkilä, M.; Pietikäinen, M. (2006). "A texture-based method for modeling the background and detecting moving objects". IEEE Transactions on Pattern Analysis and Machine Intelligence. 28 (4): 657–662. CiteSeerX 10.1.1.404.508. doi:10.1109/TPAMI.2006.68. PMID 16566514. S2CID 1152842.
- Ahonen, T.; Hadid, A.; Pietikäinen, M. (2006). "Face description with local binary patterns: Application to face recognition". IEEE Transactions on Pattern Analysis and Machine Intelligence. 28 (12): 2037–2041. doi:10.1109/tpami.2006.244. PMID 17108377. S2CID 369876.
- Pietikäinen, M.; Aikio, H.; Karppinen, K. (2006). From algorithms to vision systems – Machine Vision Group 25 years. University of Oulu.
- Zhao, G.; Pietikäinen, M. (2007). "Dynamic texture recognition using local binary patterns with an application to facial expressions". IEEE Transactions on Pattern Analysis and Machine Intelligence. 29 (6): 915–928. CiteSeerX 10.1.1.714.2104. doi:10.1109/tpami.2007.1110. PMID 17431293. S2CID 16451924.
- Heikkilä, M.; Pietikäinen, M.; Schmid, C. (2009). "Description of interest regions with local binary patterns". Pattern Recognition. 42 (3): 425–436. Bibcode:2009PatRe..42..425H. CiteSeerX 10.1.1.323.7119. doi:10.1016/j.patcog.2008.08.014.
- Pietikäinen, M.; Hadid, A.; Zhao, G.; Ahonen, T. (2011). Computer vision using local binary patterns. Springer.
- Määttä, J.; Hadid, A.; Pietikäinen, M. (2011). Face spoofing detection from single images using micro-texture analysis. Proc. International Joint Conference on Biometrics (IJCB). pp. 1–7.
- Pfister, T.; Li, X.; Zhao, G.; Pietikäinen, M. (2011). Recognising spontaneous facial micro-expressions. Proc. IEEE International Conference on Computer Vision (ICCV). pp. 1449–1456.
- Zhou, Z.; Hong, X.; Zhao, G.; Pietikäinen, M. (2014). "A compact representation of visual speech data using latent variables". IEEE Transactions on Pattern Analysis and Machine Intelligence. 36 (1): 181–187. doi:10.1109/TPAMI.2013.173. PMID 24231875. S2CID 18321703.
- Li, X.; Chen, J.; Zhao, G.; Pietikäinen, M. (2014). Remote heart rate measurement from face videos under realistic situations. Proc. IEEE Conference on Pattern Recognition and Computer Vision (CVPR). pp. 4265–4271.
- Liu, L.; Lao, S.; Fieguth, P.; Guo, Y.; Wang, X.; Pietikäinen, M. (2016). "Median robust extended local binary pattern for texture classification". IEEE Transactions on Image Processing. 25 (3): 1368–1381. Bibcode:2016ITIP...25.1368L. doi:10.1109/TIP.2016.2522378. PMID 26829791.
- Liu, L.; Fieguth, P.; Guo, Y.; Wang, X.; Pietikäinen, M. (2017). "Local binary features for texture classification: Taxonomy and experimental study". Pattern Recognition. 62: 135–160. Bibcode:2017PatRe..62..135L. doi:10.1016/j.patcog.2016.08.032.
- Su, Z.; Zhang, J.; Wang, L.; Zhang, H.; Liu, Z.; Pietikäinen, M.; Liu, L. (2023). "Lightweight pixel difference networks for visual representation learning". IEEE Transactions on Pattern Analysis and Machine Intelligence. 45 (7): 8453–8465. arXiv:2212.01057. doi:10.1109/TPAMI.2022.3229689. PMID 37015427. S2CID 254221178.
- Liu, L.; Ouyang, W.; Wang, X.; Fieguth, P.; Chen, J.; Liu, X.; Pietikäinen, M. (2020). "Deep learning for generic object detection: A Survey". International Journal of Computer Vision. 128 (2): 261–318. arXiv:1809.02165. doi:10.1007/s11263-019-01247-4. S2CID 52177403.
- Zhao, G.; Li, X.; Li, Y.; Pietikäinen, M. (2023). "Facial microexpressions: An overview". Proceedings of the IEEE.
- Pietikäinen, M.; Silven, O. (2021). Challenges of artificial intelligence – From machine learning and computer vision to emotional intelligence. University of Oulu.
- Pietikäinen, M. How will artificial intelligence affect our lives in the 2050s?.https://oulurepo.oulu.fi/handle/10024/46320
- Pietikäinen, M. (2024) From the middle of nowhere to a world-class scientist in computer vision and artificial intelligence University of Oulu. https://oulurepo.oulu.fi/handle/10024/51294
- References
