= Larry S. Davis =

American computer scientist (born 1949)

Larry S. Davis (born 1949) is an American computer scientist and professor emeritus at the University of Maryland, College Park. He currently works as a senior principal scientist at Amazon. Davis is best known for his research in the field of computer vision.

== Education ==
Davis received his Bachelor of Arts degree from Colgate University in 1970. He received his MS and PhD from the University of Maryland in 1974 and 1976, respectively.

== Career ==
From 1977 to 1981, he was an assistant professor in the Department of Computer Science at the University of Texas, Austin. He then took a position as a professor at the University of Maryland in 1981. From 1985 to 1994, he was the director of the University of Maryland Institute for Advanced Computer Studies. He served as chair of the Department of Computer Science from 1999 to 2012 and was director of the Center for Automation Research (CfAR).

Currently, Davis is a senior principal scientist at Amazon.

Davis is a fellow of the International Association for Pattern Recognition (IAPR), the Institute of Electrical and Electronics Engineers (IEEE) and the Association for Computing Machinery (ACM). His research has been cited nearly 61,000 times.
