= Digital manifold =

Special kind of combinatorial manifold which is defined in grid cell space

In mathematics, a digital manifold is a special kind of combinatorial manifold which is defined in digital space i.e. grid cell space. A combinatorial manifold is a kind of manifold which is a discretization of a manifold. It usually means a piecewise linear manifold made by simplicial complexes.

== Concepts ==
Parallel-move is used to extend an i-cell to (i+1)-cell. In other words, if A and B are two i-cells and A is a parallel-move of B, then {A,B} is an (i+1)-cell. Therefore, k-cells can be defined recursively.

Basically, a connected set of grid points M can be viewed as a digital k-manifold if: (1) any two k-cells are (k-1)-connected, (2) every (k-1)-cell has only one or two parallel-moves, and (3) M does not contain any (k+1)-cells.

== See also ==
- Digital geometry
- Digital topology
- Topological data analysis
- Topology
- Discrete mathematics
