= Poset topology =

In mathematics, the poset topology associated to a poset (S, ≤) is the Alexandrov topology (open sets are upper sets) on the poset of finite chains of (S, ≤), ordered by inclusion.

Let V be a set of vertices. An abstract simplicial complex Δ is a set of finite sets of vertices, known as faces $\sigma \subseteq V$, such that
$$\forall \rho \, \forall \sigma \!: \ \rho \subseteq \sigma \in \Delta \Rightarrow \rho \in \Delta.$$
Given a simplicial complex Δ as above, we define a (point set) topology on Δ by declaring a subset $\Gamma \subseteq \Delta$ be closed if and only if Γ is a simplicial complex, i.e.
$$\forall \rho \, \forall \sigma \!: \ \rho \subseteq \sigma \in \Gamma \Rightarrow \rho \in \Gamma.$$
This is the Alexandrov topology on the poset of faces of Δ.

The order complex associated to a poset (S, ≤) has the set S as vertices, and the finite chains of (S, ≤) as faces. The poset topology associated to a poset (S, ≤) is then the Alexandrov topology on the order complex associated to (S, ≤).

== See also ==
- Topological combinatorics
