= Herbert Freeman =

American computer scientist (1925–2020)

- Born: Herbert Freinmann; December 13, 1925; Frankfurt, Germany
- Died: November 15, 2020 (aged 94); New Jersey, United States
- Occupation: Computer scientist
- Spouse: Joan Sleppin
- Children: 3
- Awards: IEEE Computer Society's Computer Pioneer award (1999)

Dr. Herbert Freeman (born Herbert Freinmann, December 13, 1925 – November 15, 2020) was an American computer scientist who made important contributions to the field of automatic label placement, computer graphics, including spatial anti-aliasing, and machine vision.

== Personal life ==
Herbert Freeman was born Herbert Freimann in Frankfurt, Germany on December 13, 1925. Freeman's parents, Leo and Johanna, and his brother, Henry, emigrated to the United States in 1936. Herbert was diagnosed with tuberculosis, and was unable to join his family in the United States until 1938. He received his B.S.E.E. degree from Union College, New York, and his Master's and Eng.Sc.D. degree from Columbia University, New York. He married Joan Sleppin in 1955 and they had three children, Nancy, Susan, and Robert. Freeman died on November 15, 2020, in his home in New Jersey, USA.

== Career in Computer Science ==
Freeman held many professorial posts such as in RPI (Rensselaer Polytechnic Institute), NYU, and Rutgers University. Freeman was the recipient of several awards, including the IEEE Computer Society's Computer Pioneer award (1999). Freeman was also a Fellow of the ACM, a Life Fellow of the IEEE, and a Guggenheim Fellow. Professor Freeman also founded MapText, Inc., in 1997.

== See also ==
- Dr. Freeman's homepage at Rutgers University
- Dr. Freeman's White Paper on Automated Cartographic Text Placement
- Guide to the Herbert Freeman Family Collection, Leo Baeck Institute, New York, New York.
- Freeman's memoir Cobblestones.
