= Decision mathematics =

Decision mathematics may refer to:

- Discrete mathematics
- Decision theory, identifying the values, uncertainties and other issues relevant in a decision
