= Langevin equation =

Stochastic differential equation

In physics, a Langevin equation (named after Paul Langevin) is a stochastic differential equation describing how a system evolves when subjected to a combination of deterministic and fluctuating ("random") forces. The dependent variables in a Langevin equation typically are collective (macroscopic) variables changing only slowly in comparison to the other (microscopic) variables of the system. The fast (microscopic) variables are responsible for the stochastic nature of the Langevin equation. One application is to Brownian motion, which models the fluctuating motion of a small particle in a fluid.

== Brownian motion as a prototype ==
The original Langevin equation describes Brownian motion, the apparent random movement of a particle in a fluid due to collisions with the molecules of the fluid,
$$m\frac{\mathrm d\mathbf{v}}{\mathrm d t} = -\lambda \mathbf{v} + \boldsymbol{\eta}(t),$$
where $\mathbf{v}$ is the velocity of the particle, $\lambda$ is its damping coefficient, and $m$ is its mass. The force acting on the particle is written as a sum of a viscous force proportional to the particle's velocity (Stokes' law), and a noise term $\boldsymbol{\eta}(t)$ representing the effect of the collisions with the molecules of the fluid. The force $\boldsymbol{\eta}(t)$ has a Gaussian probability distribution with correlation function
$$\langle \eta_i(t)\, \eta_j(t')\rangle = 2\lambda k_\text{B}T \delta_{i,j} \delta(t - t'),$$
where $k_\text{B}$ is the Boltzmann constant, $T$ is the temperature, and $\eta_i(t)$ is the i-th component of the vector $\boldsymbol{\eta}(t)$. The $\delta$-function form of the time correlation means that the force at a time $t$ is uncorrelated with the force at any other time. This is an approximation: the actual random force has a nonzero correlation time corresponding to the collision time of the molecules. However, the Langevin equation is used to describe the motion of a "macroscopic" particle at a much longer time scale, and in this limit the $\delta$-correlation and the Langevin equation becomes virtually exact. This approximation of $\delta$-correlated (white) noise breaks down under certain conditions, especially in the presence of external driving forces that bring the system out of equilibrium, such as shear flow or for dense charged systems under AC external drive. This is also the case of the Langevin equation for relativistic systems, where the $\delta$-correlated noise assumption is in tension with the principle of locality.

Another common feature of the Langevin equation is the occurrence of the damping coefficient $\lambda$ in the correlation function of the random force, which in an equilibrium system is an expression of the Einstein relation.

== Mathematical aspects ==
A strictly $\delta$-correlated fluctuating force $\boldsymbol{\eta}(t)$ is not a function in the usual mathematical sense, and even the derivative $\mathrm d\mathbf{v}/\mathrm{d}t$ is not defined in this limit. This problem disappears when the Langevin equation is written in integral form
$$m\mathbf{v} = m\mathbf{v}_0 + \int_{t_0}^t \big({-\lambda} \mathbf{v} + \boldsymbol{\eta}(t)\big)\,\mathrm{d}t.$$
Therefore, the differential form is only an abbreviation for its time integral. The general mathematical term for equations of this type is "stochastic differential equation".

Another mathematical ambiguity occurs for Langevin equations with multiplicative noise, which refers to noise terms that are multiplied by a non-constant function of the dependent variables, e.g., $|\boldsymbol{v}(t)|\, \boldsymbol{\eta}(t)$. If a multiplicative noise is intrinsic to the system, its definition is ambiguous, as it is equally valid to interpret it according to Stratonovich or Itô scheme (see Itô calculus). Nevertheless, physical observables are independent of the interpretation, provided the latter is applied consistently when manipulating the equation. This is necessary because the symbolic rules of calculus differ depending on the interpretation scheme. If the noise is external to the system, the appropriate interpretation is the Stratonovich one.

== Generic Langevin equation ==
There is a formal derivation of a generic Langevin equation from classical mechanics. This generic equation plays a central role in the theory of critical dynamics, and other areas of nonequilibrium statistical mechanics. The equation for Brownian motion above is a special case.

An essential step in the derivation is the division of the degrees of freedom into the categories slow and fast. For example, local thermodynamic equilibrium in a liquid is reached within a few collision times, but it takes much longer for densities of conserved quantities like mass and energy to relax to equilibrium. Thus, densities of conserved quantities, and in particular their long-wavelength components, are slow-variable candidates. This division can be expressed formally with the Zwanzig projection operator. Nevertheless, the derivation is not completely rigorous from a mathematical physics perspective because it relies on assumptions that lack rigorous proof, and instead are justified only as plausible approximations of physical systems.

Let $A = \{A_i\}$ denote the slow variables. The generic Langevin equation then reads
$$\frac{\mathrm{d}A_i}{\mathrm{d}t} =
k_\text{B}T \sum\limits_j [A_i, A_j] \frac{\mathrm{d}\mathcal{H}}{\mathrm{d}A_j} -
\sum\limits_j \lambda_{i,j}(A) \frac{\mathrm{d}\mathcal{H}}{\mathrm{d}A_j} +
\sum\limits_j \frac{\mathrm{d}\lambda_{i,j}(A)}{\mathrm{d}A_j} +
\eta_i(t).$$

The fluctuating force $\eta_i(t)$ obeys a Gaussian probability distribution with correlation function
$$\langle \eta_i(t)\, \eta_j(t')\rangle = 2\lambda_{i,j}(A) \delta(t - t').$$
This implies the Onsager reciprocity relation $\lambda_{i,j} = \lambda_{j,i}$ for the damping coefficients $\lambda$. The dependence $\mathrm{d}\lambda_{i,j}/\mathrm{d}A_j$ of $\lambda$ on $A$ is negligible in most cases. The symbol $\mathcal{H} = -\ln(p_0)$ denotes the Hamiltonian of the system, where $p_0(A)$ is the equilibrium probability distribution of the variables $A$. Finally, $[A_i, A_j]$ is the projection of the Poisson bracket of the slow variables $A_i$ and $A_j$ onto the space of slow variables.

In the Brownian motion case one would have $\mathcal{H} = \mathbf{p}^2/(2mk_\text{B}T)$, $A = \{\mathbf{p}\}$ or $A = \{\mathbf{x}, \mathbf{p}\}$, and $[x_i, p_j] = \delta_{i,j}$. The equation of motion $\mathrm{d}\mathbf{x}/\mathrm{d}t = \mathbf{p}/m$ for $\mathbf{x}$ is exact: there is no fluctuating force $\eta_x$ and no damping coefficient $\lambda_{x,p}$.

== Examples ==
=== Thermal noise in an electrical resistor ===
An electric circuit consisting of a resistor and a capacitor

There is a close analogy between the paradigmatic Brownian particle discussed above and Johnson noise, the electric voltage generated by thermal fluctuations in a resistor. The diagram shows an electric circuit consisting of a resistance R and a capacitance C. The slow variable is the voltage U between the ends of the resistor. The Hamiltonian reads $\mathcal{H} = E / k_\text{B}T = CU^2 / (2k_\text{B}T)$, and the Langevin equation becomes
$$\frac{\mathrm{d}U}{\mathrm{d}t} =
-\frac{U}{RC} + \eta(t), \quad \langle\eta(t)\, \eta(t')\rangle =
\frac{2k_\text{B}T}{RC^2} \delta(t - t').$$

This equation may be used to determine the correlation function
$$\langle U(t)\, U(t')\rangle =
\frac{k_\text{B}T}{C} \exp\left(-\frac{|t - t'|}{RC}\right) \approx
2Rk_\text{B}T \delta(t - t'),$$
which becomes white noise (Johnson noise) when the capacitance C becomes negligibly small.

=== Critical dynamics ===
The dynamics of the order parameter $\varphi$ of a second-order phase transition slows down near the critical point and can be described with a Langevin equation. The simplest case is the universality class "model A" with a non-conserved scalar order parameter, realized, for instance, in axial ferromagnets,
$$\begin{align}
\frac{\partial}{\partial t} \varphi(\mathbf{x}, t) &= -\lambda\frac{\delta\mathcal{H}}{\delta\varphi} + \eta{(\mathbf{x}, t)}, \\
\mathcal{H} &= \int d^{d}x \left[\frac{1}{2} r_0 \varphi^2 + u \varphi^4 + \frac{1}{2} (\nabla\varphi)^2\right], \\
\langle \eta(\mathbf{x}, t) \,\eta(\mathbf{x}', t')\rangle &= 2 \lambda \,\delta(\mathbf{x} - \mathbf{x}') \,\delta(t - t').
\end{align}$$

Other universality classes (the nomenclature is "model A", ..., "model J") contain a diffusing order parameter, order parameters with several components, other critical variables and/or contributions from Poisson brackets.

=== Harmonic oscillator in a fluid ===
Phase portrait of a harmonic oscillator showing spreading due to the Langevin equation

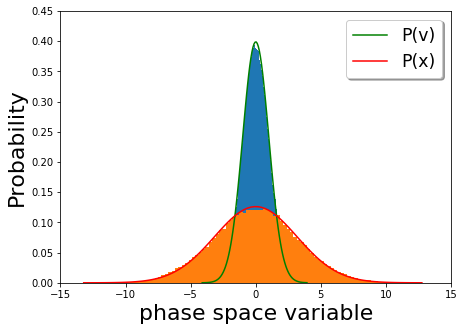
Equilibrium probability for Langevin dynamics in harmonic potential

$$m\frac{dv}{dt} = -\lambda v + \eta (t) - kx.$$

A particle in a fluid is described by a Langevin equation with a potential energy function, a damping force, and thermal fluctuations given by the fluctuation dissipation theorem. If the potential is quadratic, then the constant energy curves are ellipses, as shown in the first figure. If there is dissipation but no thermal noise, a particle continually loses energy to the environment, and its time-dependent phase portrait (velocity vs position) corresponds to an inward spiral toward 0 velocity. By contrast, thermal fluctuations continually add energy to the particle and prevent it from reaching exactly 0 velocity. Rather, the initial ensemble of stochastic oscillators approaches a steady state in which the velocity and position are distributed according to the Maxwell–Boltzmann distribution. In the second plot, the long-time velocity distribution (blue) and position distributions (orange) in a harmonic potential ($U = \tfrac{1}{2} kx^2$) is plotted with the Boltzmann probabilities for velocity (green) and position (red). In particular, the late time behavior depicts thermal equilibrium.

The following plot corresponds to solutions of the complete Langevin equation for a lightly damped harmonic oscillator, obtained using the Euler–Maruyama method. The left panel shows the time evolution of the phase portrait at different temperatures. The right panel captures the corresponding equilibrium probability distributions. At zero temperature, the velocity slowly decays from its initial value (the red dot) to zero, over the course of a handful of oscillations, due to damping. For nonzero temperatures, the velocity can be kicked to values higher than the initial value due to thermal fluctuations. At long times, the velocity remains nonzero, and the position and velocity distributions correspond to that of thermal equilibrium.

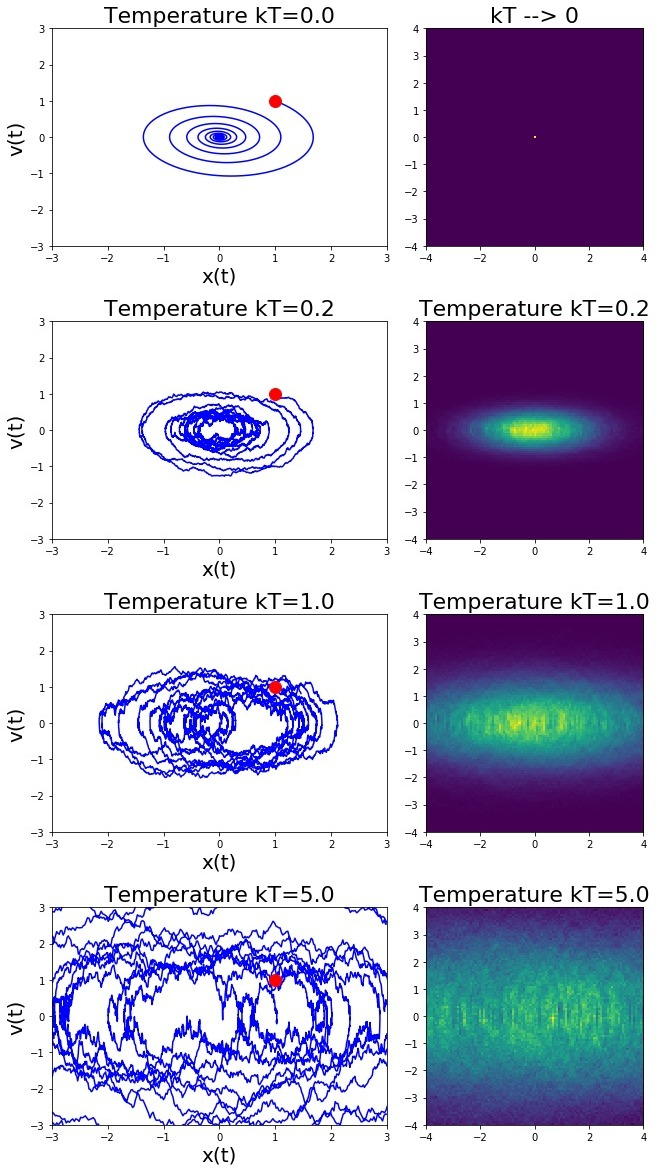

=== Trajectories of free Brownian particles ===
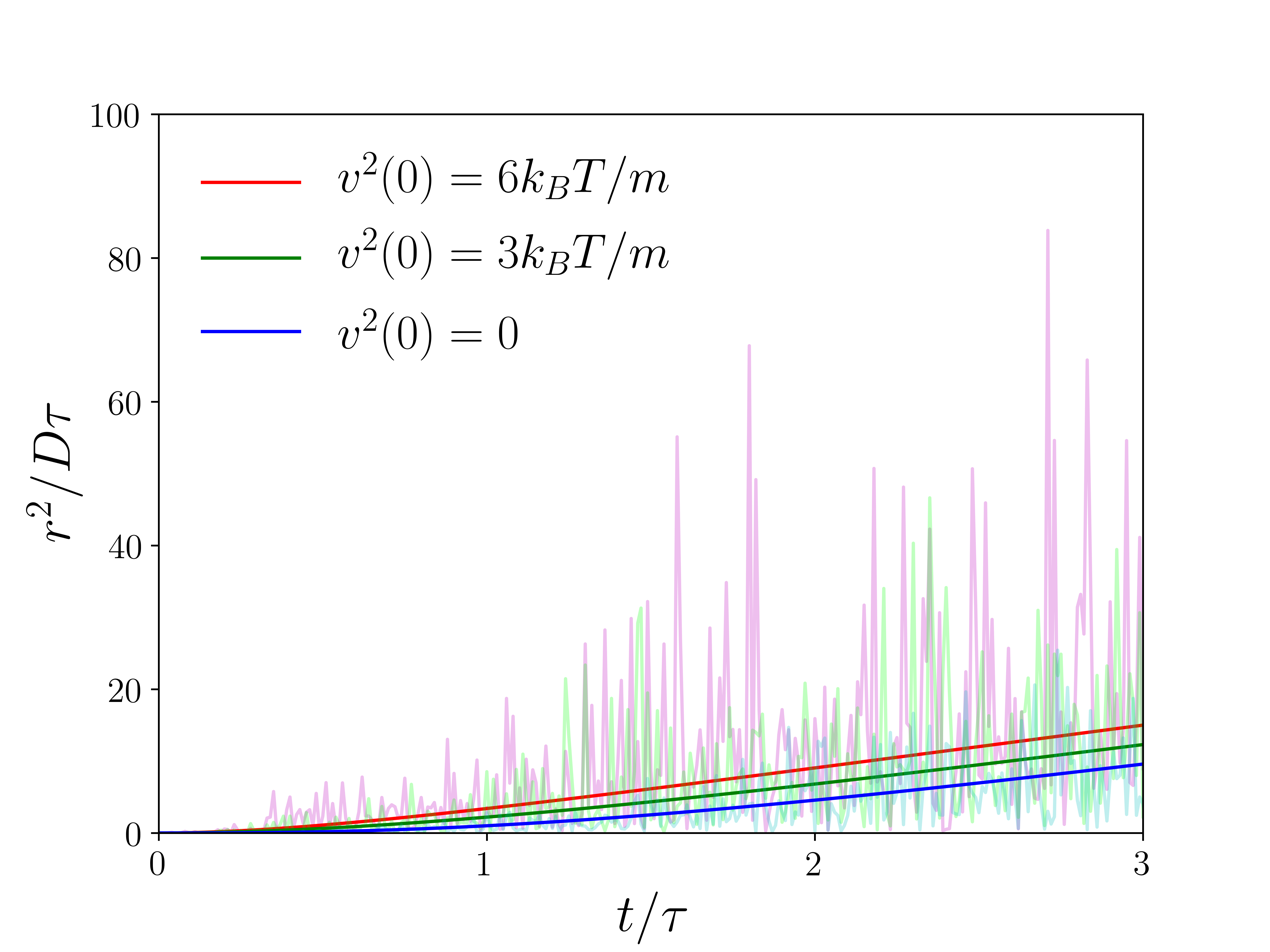
Simulated squared displacements of free Brownian particles (semi-transparent wiggly lines) as a function of time, for three selected choices of initial squared velocity, which are 0, 3k_{B}T/m, and 6k_{B}T/m respectively, with 3k_{B}T/m being the equipartition value in thermal equilibrium. The colored solid curves denote the mean squared displacements for the corresponding parameter choices.

Consider a free particle of mass $m$ with equation of motion described by
$$m \frac{d \mathbf{v}}{dt} = -\frac{\mathbf{v}}{\mu} + \boldsymbol{\eta}(t),$$
where $\mathbf{v} = d\mathbf{r}/dt$ is the particle velocity, $\mu$ is the particle mobility, and $\boldsymbol{\eta}(t) = m \mathbf{a}(t)$ is a rapidly fluctuating force whose time-average vanishes over a characteristic timescale $t_\text{c}$ of particle collisions, i.e. $\overline{\boldsymbol{\eta}(t)} = 0$. The general solution to the equation of motion is
$$\mathbf{v}(t) = \mathbf{v}(0) e^{-t/\tau} + \int_0^t \mathbf{a}(t') e^{-(t-t')/\tau} \,dt',$$
where $\tau = m\mu$ is the correlation time of the noise term. It can also be shown that the autocorrelation function of the particle velocity $\mathbf{v}$ is given by
$$\begin{align}
R_{vv}(t_1,t_2) &\equiv \langle\mathbf{v}(t_1) \cdot \mathbf{v}(t_2)\rangle \\
&= v^2(0) e^{-(t_1 + t_2)/\tau} + \int_0^{t_1} \int_0^{t_2} R_{aa}(t_1', t_2') e^{-(t_1 + t_2 - t_1' - t_2')/\tau} \,dt_1' \,dt_2' \\
&\simeq v^2(0) e^{-|t_2 - t_1|/\tau} + \left[\frac{3k_\text{B}T}{m} - v^2(0)\right] \left[e^{-|t_2 - t_1|/\tau} - e^{-(t_1 + t_2)/\tau}\right],
\end{align}$$
where we have used the property that the variables $\mathbf{a}(t_1')$ and $\mathbf{a}(t_2')$ become uncorrelated for time separations $t_2' - t_1' \gg t_\text{c}$. Besides, the value of $\lim_{t \to \infty} \langle v^2 (t) \rangle = \lim_{t \to \infty} R_{vv}(t, t)$ is set to be equal to $3k_\text{B}T/m$, such that it obeys the equipartition theorem. If the system is initially at thermal equilibrium already with $v^2(0) = 3 k_\text{B}T/m$, then $\langle v^2(t) \rangle = 3 k_\text{B}T/m$ for all $t$, meaning that the system remains at equilibrium at all times.

The velocity $\mathbf{v}(t)$ of the Brownian particle can be integrated to yield its trajectory $\mathbf{r}(t)$. If it is initially located at the origin with probability 1, then the result is
$$\mathbf{r}(t) = \mathbf{v}(0) \tau (1 - e^{-t/\tau}) + \tau \int_0^t \mathbf{a}(t') [1 - e^{-(t - t')/\tau}] \,dt'.$$
Hence, the average displacement $\langle \mathbf{r}(t) \rangle = \mathbf{v}(0) \tau (1 - e^{-t/\tau})$ asymptotes to $\mathbf{v}(0) \tau$ as the system relaxes. The mean squared displacement can be determined similarly:
$$\langle r^2(t) \rangle = v^2(0) \tau^2 (1 - e^{-t/\tau})^2 - \frac{3k_\text{B}T}{m} \tau^2 (1 - e^{-t/\tau}) (3 - e^{-t/\tau}) + \frac{6k_\text{B}T}{m} \tau t.$$
This expression implies that $\langle r^2(t \ll \tau) \rangle \simeq v^2(0) t^2$, indicating that the motion of Brownian particles at timescales much shorter than the relaxation time $\tau$ of the system is (approximately) time-reversal invariant. On the other hand, $\langle r^2(t \gg \tau) \rangle \simeq 6 k_\text{B}T \tau t/m = 6 \mu k_\text{B}Tt = 6Dt$, which indicates an irreversible, dissipative process.

=== Recovering Boltzmann statistics ===
If the external potential is conservative and the noise term derives from a reservoir in thermal equilibrium, then the long-time solution to the Langevin equation must reduce to the Boltzmann distribution, which is the probability distribution function for particles in thermal equilibrium. In the special case of overdamped dynamics, the inertia of the particle is negligible in comparison to the damping force, and the trajectory $x(t)$ is described by the overdamped Langevin equation
$$\lambda \frac{dx}{dt} = - \frac{\partial V(x)}{\partial x} + \eta(t) \equiv
-\frac{\partial V(x)}{\partial x} + \sqrt{2\lambda k_\text{B}T} \frac{dB_t}{dt},$$
where $\lambda$ is the damping constant. The term $\eta(t)$ is white noise, characterized by $\langle\eta(t)\,\eta(t')\rangle = 2k_\text{B}T \lambda \delta(t - t')$ (formally, the Wiener process). One way to solve this equation is to introduce a test function $f$ and calculate its average. The average of $f\big(x(t)\big)$ should be time-independent for finite $x(t)$, leading to
$$\frac{d}{dt} \big\langle f\big(x(t)\big)\big\rangle = 0.$$

Itô's lemma for the Itô drift-diffusion process $dX_t = \mu_t \, dt + \sigma_t \, dB_t$ says that the differential of a twice-differentiable function f(t, x) is given by
$$df = \left(\frac{\partial f}{\partial t} + \mu_t\frac{\partial f}{\partial x} + \frac{\sigma_t^2}{2} \frac{\partial^2 f}{\partial x^2}\right)\,dt + \sigma_t \frac{\partial f}{\partial x}\,dB_t.$$
Applying this to the calculation of $\big\langle f\big(x(t)\big)\big\rangle$ gives
$$\left\langle -f'(x) \frac{\partial V}{\partial x} + k_\text{B} T  f''(x) \right\rangle = 0.$$
This average can be written using the probability density function $p(x)$:
$$\begin{align}
& \int \left(-f'(x) \frac{\partial V}{\partial x} p(x) + k_\text{B}T f''(x) p(x) \right) \,dx \\
&\quad = \int \left(-f'(x) \frac{\partial V}{\partial x} p(x) - k_\text{B}T f'(x) p'(x) \right) \,dx \\
&\quad = 0,
\end{align}$$
where the second term was integrated by parts (hence the negative sign). Since this is true for arbitrary functions $f$, it follows that
$$\frac{\partial V}{\partial x} p(x) + k_\text{B}T p'(x) = 0,$$
thus recovering the Boltzmann distribution
$$p(x) \propto \exp \left(-\frac{V(x)}{k_\text{B}T}\right).$$

== Equivalent techniques ==
In some situations, one is primarily interested in the noise-averaged behavior of the Langevin equation, as opposed to the solution for particular realizations of the noise. This section describes techniques for obtaining this averaged behavior that are distinct from—but also equivalent to—the stochastic calculus inherent in the Langevin equation.

=== Fokker–Planck equation ===
A Fokker–Planck equation is a deterministic equation for the time-dependent probability density $P(A, t)$ of stochastic variables $A$. The Fokker–Planck equation corresponding to the generic Langevin equation described in this article is the following:
$$\frac{\partial P(A, t)}{\partial t} =
\sum_{i,j} \frac{\partial}{\partial A_i} \left(-k_\text{B}T [A_i, A_j] \frac{\partial\mathcal{H}}{\partial A_j} + \lambda_{i,j} \frac{\partial\mathcal{H}}{\partial A_j} + \lambda_{i,j} \frac{\partial}{\partial A_j}\right) P(A, t).$$
The equilibrium distribution $P(A) = p_0(A) = \text{const} \times \exp(-\mathcal{H})$ is a stationary solution.

==== Klein–Kramers equation ====
The Fokker–Planck equation for an underdamped Brownian particle is called the Klein–Kramers equation. If the Langevin equations are written as
$$\begin{align}
\dot\mathbf{r} &= \frac{\mathbf{p}}{m}, \\
\dot\mathbf{p} &= -\xi \, \mathbf{p} - \nabla V(\mathbf{r}) + \sqrt{2 m \xi k_\text{B}T} \boldsymbol{\eta}(t), \qquad
\langle \boldsymbol{\eta}^\mathrm{T}(t)\, \boldsymbol{\eta}(t') \rangle = \mathbf{I} \delta(t - t'),
\end{align}$$
where $\mathbf{p}$ is the momentum, then the corresponding Fokker–Planck equation is
$$\frac{\partial f}{\partial t} + \frac{1}{m} \mathbf{p} \cdot \nabla_\mathbf{r} f = \xi \nabla_\mathbf{p} \cdot (\mathbf{p} f) + \nabla_\mathbf{p} \cdot (\nabla V(\mathbf{r}) \, f) + m \xi k_\text{B}T \, \nabla_\mathbf{p}^2 f.$$
Here $\nabla_\mathbf{r}$ and $\nabla_\mathbf{p}$ are the gradient operators with respect to r and p, and $\nabla_\mathbf{p}^2$ is the Laplacian with respect to p.

In $d$-dimensional free space, corresponding to $V(\mathbf{r}) = \text{const}$ on $\mathbb{R}^d$, this equation can be solved using Fourier transforms. If the particle is initialized at $t = 0$ with position $\mathbf{r}'$ and momentum $\mathbf{p}'$, corresponding to initial condition $f(\mathbf{r}, \mathbf{p}, 0) = \delta(\mathbf{r} - \mathbf{r}')\,\delta(\mathbf{p}-\mathbf{p}')$, then the solution is
$$\begin{align}
f(\mathbf{r}, \mathbf{p}, t) &= \frac{1}{\left(2\pi\sigma_X \sigma_P \sqrt{1 - \beta^2}\right)^d} \\
&\times \exp\left[-\frac{1}{2(1 - \beta^2)} \left(\frac{|\mathbf{r} - \boldsymbol{\mu}_X|^2}{\sigma_X^2} + \frac{|\mathbf{p} - \boldsymbol{\mu}_P|^2}{\sigma_P^2} - \frac{2\beta (\mathbf{r} - \boldsymbol{\mu}_X) \cdot (\mathbf{p} - \boldsymbol{\mu}_P)}{\sigma_X \sigma_P} \right) \right],
\end{align}$$
where
$$\begin{align}
\sigma^2_X &= \frac{k_\text{B}T}{m \xi^2} [1 + 2 \xi t - (2 - e^{-\xi t})^2], \qquad
\sigma^2_P = m k_\text{B}T (1 - e^{-2\xi t}), \\
\beta &= \frac{k_\text{B}T}{\xi\sigma_X \sigma_P} (1 - e^{-\xi t})^2, \\
\boldsymbol{\mu}_X &= \mathbf{r}' + (m \xi)^{-1} (1 - e^{-\xi t}) \mathbf{p}', \qquad
\boldsymbol{\mu}_P = \mathbf{p}' e^{-\xi t}.
\end{align}$$

In three spatial dimensions, the mean squared displacement is
$$\langle \mathbf{r}(t)^2 \rangle =
\int f(\mathbf{r}, \mathbf{p}, t) \mathbf{r}^2 \,d\mathbf{r}\,d\mathbf{p} =
\boldsymbol{\mu}_X^2 + 3 \sigma_X^2.$$

=== Path integral ===
A path-integral equivalent to a Langevin equation can be obtained from the corresponding Fokker–Planck equation or by transforming the Gaussian probability distribution $P^{(\eta)}(\eta)\,\mathrm{d}\eta$ of the fluctuating force $\eta$ to a probability distribution of the slow variables, schematically $P(A)\,\mathrm{d}A = P^{(\eta)}\big(\eta(A)\big) \det(\mathrm{d}\eta/\mathrm{d}A)\,\mathrm{d}A$. The functional determinant and associated mathematical subtleties drop out if the Langevin equation is discretized in the natural (causal) way, where $A(t + \Delta t) - A(t)$ depends on $A(t)$ but not on $A(t + \Delta t)$. It turns out to be convenient to introduce auxiliary response variables $\tilde A$. The path-integral equivalent to the generic Langevin equation then reads
$$\int P(A, \tilde{A})\,\mathrm{d}A\,\mathrm{d}\tilde{A} =
N \int \exp\big(L(A, \tilde{A})\big)\,\mathrm{d}A\,\mathrm{d}\tilde{A},$$
where $N$ is a normalization factor, and
$$L(A, \tilde{A}) = \int \sum_{i,j} \left\{\tilde{A}_{i} \lambda_{i,j} \tilde{A}_{j} -
\widetilde{A}_{i} \left\{\delta_{i,j} \frac{\mathrm{d}A_j}{\mathrm{d}t} -
k_\text{B}T [A_i, A_j] \frac{\mathrm{d}\mathcal{H}}{\mathrm{d}A_{j}} +
\lambda_{i,j} \frac{\mathrm{d}\mathcal{H}}{\mathrm{d}A_j} -
\frac{\mathrm{d}\lambda_{i,j}}{\mathrm{d}A_j}
\right\}
\right\} \,\mathrm{d}t.$$
The path-integral formulation allows for the use of tools from quantum field theory, such as perturbation and renormalization-group methods. This formulation is typically referred to as either the Martin–Siggia–Rose formalism or the Janssen-De Dominicis formalism after its developers. The mathematical formalism for this representation can be developed on abstract Wiener space.

== See also ==
- Grote–Hynes theory
- Langevin dynamics
- Stochastic thermodynamics
