= Discrete differential geometry =

Area of mathematics

Discrete differential geometry is the study of discrete counterparts of notions in differential geometry. Instead of smooth curves and surfaces, there are polygons, meshes, and simplicial complexes. It is used in the study of computer graphics, geometry processing and topological combinatorics.

Discrete differential geometry (DDG) aims not merely to discretize objects or equations, but to discretize the entire theory of classical differential geometry. In this context, classical differential geometry is expected to emerge as a limit of refinement of the discretization. Furthermore, in the process of refinement, DDG places an emphasis on the so-called "mimetic" viewpoint, that is, whether the essential properties of the system from the smooth setting are exactly preserved regardless of the size of the mesh elements.

Generally, for a given smooth geometry, one can suggest many different discretizations with the same continuous limit. In other words, there is no single "correct" way to discretize a given geometric quantity; rather, there are various different ways, each suited to specific purposes. Therefore, it is necessary to choose the appropriate discretization suited to your purpose (the so-called "game" of DDG).

== Initiatives ==
=== Integrable Discretization ===
Integrable discretization is a systematic discretization based on integrable systems, which originates from the study of localized waves called solitons in mathematical physics. Integrable discretization gives an efficient (and nearly algorithmic) method to discretize a theory (not just its objects). Since curves and surfaces consistent with discrete integrable systems are in a sense "good," integrable discretization has been applied in fields such as industrial design, computational architecture, and others.

Introductory text: A. I. Bobenko, Y. B. Suris, "Discrete Differential Deometry. Consistency as Integrability." arXiv, 2005, arXiv:math/0504358 [math.DG]

=== Discrete Differential Operators ===
In contrast to the purely geometric perspective, differential operators provide a very different point of view. This dual perspective enriches understanding on both sides, and leads to the development of practical algorithms for working with real-world geometric data. Discrete Laplacians $\Delta$ are defined using discrete exterior calculus (DEC). In general, the smooth Laplacian has variety of discretizations depending on the definition of inner product (the "game" of DDG). However, it is known that certain types of meshes allow for "perfect" discrete Laplacians, offering a connection between geometry and (discrete) differential operators.

Introductory text: K. Crane, "Discrete Differential Geometry: An Applied Introduction," 2025.

=== The Discrete Differential Geometry of n-Simplices ===
The research subject of the discrete differential geometry of n-simplices (DDGNS) is "polygonal lines" consisting of n-simplices, i.e., n-dimensional objects obtained by connecting n-simplices one by one via their common faces in R^{n}. DDGNS focuses primarily on "quantization" rather than "discretization" of classical differential geometry. Just as classical mechanics does not appear as a smooth limit of quantum mechanics, classical differential geometry does not appear as a smooth limit of DDGNS. Currently, DDGNS is applied in the field of protein science.

Introductory text: N. Morikawa, "A Novel Mathematical Model of Protein Interactions from the Perspective of Electron Delocalization," arXiv:2509.18882 [q-bio.BM]

=== The Discrete Differential Geometry on General Polygonal Meshes ===
The Discrete exterior calculus offers discrete versions of differential operators associated to differential geometry, such as Hodge Laplacian or Lie derivative not only on triangle meshes but also on surface meshes, whose faces are simple polygons. The discrete exterior calculus thus provides a framework for mean curvature flow of surface polygonal meshes, Helmholtz–Hodge decomposition or Lie advection of discretized vector fields over given surface mesh.

Introductory text: L. Ptackova & L. Velho, "A simple and complete discrete exterior calculus on general polygonal meshes," 2021.

== See also ==
- Discrete Laplace operator
- Discrete exterior calculus
- Discrete Morse theory
- Topological combinatorics
- Spectral shape analysis
- Analysis on fractals
- Discrete calculus
