= Helmholtz–Hodge decomposition =

Mathematical decompositions of vector fields

The Helmholtz–Hodge decomposition (HHD) is the name given to mathematical decompositions of vector fields over both continuous and discrete spaces. In particular, it applies to decompositions of stationary stochastic processes, and to edge-flows over graphs and simplicial complexes. It is closely related to, but distinct from, both the Helmholtz decomposition of certain vector fields, and Hodge theory from algebraic geometry. It has applications to stochastic thermodynamics, signal processing on discrete structures, and the structure of tournaments and games. It is named after physicist Hermann von Helmholtz and mathematician W. V. D. Hodge.

== Continuous version ==
The HHD in continuous space applies to stochastic differential equations (SDEs). Given a general SDE of the form,

$$\mathrm{d}X_t = f(X_t)\,\mathrm{d}t + \sigma(X_t)\,\mathrm{d}W_t$$,

it is a stationary process if there is a solution, $\pi(x)$, to the stationary Fokker–Planck equation

$$0 = \nabla \cdot J(x)$$

where

$$J(x) = f(x)\pi(x) - \nabla \cdot( D(x)\pi(x)),$$

is the probability flux, and $D(x) = \frac{1}{2}\sigma(x)\sigma(x)^{\top}$ is the diffusion matrix.

For a stationary process, the HHD is a decomposition of the drift function, $f$, into two components,

$$f(x) = f_{\text{irr}}(x) + f_{\text{rev}}(x),$$
$$f_{\text{irr}}(x) = J(x)/\pi(x),$$
$$f_{\text{rev}}(x) = D(x)\nabla \log(\pi(x)) - \nabla \cdot D(x),$$

where $f_{\text{irr}}(x)$ are the time-irreversible forces that keep the process in a non-equilibrium steady-state (NESS), and $f_{\text{rev}}(x)$ are the time-reversible forces. These functions are odd and even under time-reversal respectively.
