= Grote–Hynes theory =

Grote–Hynes theory is a theory of reaction rate in a solution phase. This rate theory was developed by James T. Hynes with his graduate student Richard F. Grote in 1980.

The theory is based on the generalized Langevin equation (GLE). This theory introduced the concept of frequency dependent friction for chemical rate processes in solution phase. Because of inclusion of the frequency dependent friction instead of constant friction, the theory successfully predicts the rate constant including where the reaction barrier is large and of high frequency, where the diffusion over the barrier starts decoupling from viscosity of the medium. This was the weakness of Kramer's rate theory, which underestimated the reaction rate having large barrier with high frequency.
