= Discrete exterior calculus =

In mathematics, the discrete exterior calculus (DEC) is the extension of the exterior calculus to discrete spaces including graphs, finite element meshes, and lately also general polygonal meshes (non-flat and non-convex). DEC methods have proved to be very powerful in improving and analyzing finite element methods: for instance, DEC-based methods allow the use of highly non-uniform meshes to obtain accurate results. Non-uniform meshes are advantageous because they allow the use of large elements where the process to be simulated is relatively simple, as opposed to a fine resolution where the process may be complicated (e.g., near an obstruction to a fluid flow), while using less computational power than if a uniformly fine mesh were used.

== The discrete exterior derivative ==
Stokes' theorem relates the integral of a differential (n − 1)-form ω over the boundary ∂M of an n-dimensional manifold M to the integral of dω (the exterior derivative of ω, and a differential n-form on M) over M itself:

$$\int_{M} \mathrm{d} \omega = \int_{\partial M} \omega.$$

One could think of differential k-forms as linear operators that act on k-dimensional "bits" of space, in which case one might prefer to use the bracket notation for a dual pairing. In this notation, Stokes' theorem reads as

$$\langle \mathrm{d} \omega \mid M \rangle = \langle \omega \mid \partial M \rangle.$$

In finite element analysis, the first stage is often the approximation of the domain of interest by a triangulation, T. For example, a curve would be approximated as a union of straight line segments; a surface would be approximated by a union of triangles, whose edges are straight line segments, which themselves terminate in points. Topologists would refer to such a construction as a simplicial complex. The boundary operator on this triangulation/simplicial complex T is defined in the usual way: for example, if L is a directed line segment from one point, a, to another, b, then the boundary ∂L of L is the formal difference b − a.

A k-form on T is a linear operator acting on k-dimensional subcomplexes of T; e.g., a 0-form assigns values to points, and extends linearly to linear combinations of points; a 1-form assigns values to line segments in a similarly linear way. If ω is a k-form on T, then the discrete exterior derivative dω of ω is the unique (k + 1)-form defined so that Stokes' theorem holds:

$$\langle \mathrm{d} \omega \mid S \rangle = \langle \omega \mid \partial S \rangle.$$

For every (k + 1)-dimensional subcomplex of T, S.

Other operators and operations such as the discrete wedge product, Hodge star, or Lie derivative can also be defined.

== See also ==
- Discrete differential geometry
- Discrete Morse theory
- Topological combinatorics
- Discrete calculus
