= Analysis on fractals =

Area of mathematical study

Analysis on fractals or calculus on fractals is a generalization of calculus on smooth manifolds to calculus on fractals.

The theory describes dynamical phenomena which occur on objects modelled by fractals. It studies questions such as "how does heat diffuse in a fractal?" and "how does a fractal vibrate?"

In the smooth case the operator that occurs most often in the equations modelling these phenomena is the Laplacian, so the starting point for the theory of analysis on fractals is to define a Laplacian on fractals. This turns out not to be a full differential operator in the usual sense but has many of the desired properties. There are a number of approaches to defining the Laplacian: probabilistic, analytical or measure theoretic.

== See also ==
- Time scale calculus for dynamic equations on a cantor set.
- Differential geometry
- Discrete differential geometry
