= Discrete transform =

Mathematical transform on discrete signals

In signal processing, discrete transforms (or discrete integral transform) are mathematical transforms, often linear transforms, of signals between discrete domains, such as between discrete time and discrete frequency.

Many common integral transforms used in signal processing have their discrete counterparts. For example, for the Fourier transform the counterpart is the discrete Fourier transform.

In addition to spectral analysis of signals, discrete transforms play important role in data compression, signal detection, digital filtering and correlation analysis. The discrete cosine transform (DCT) is the most widely used transform coding compression algorithm in digital media, followed by the discrete wavelet transform (DWT).

Transforms between a discrete domain and a continuous domain are not discrete transforms. For example, the discrete-time Fourier transform and the Z-transform, from discrete time to continuous frequency, and the Fourier series, from continuous time to discrete frequency, are outside the class of discrete transforms.

Classical signal processing deals with one-dimensional discrete transforms. Other application areas, such as image processing, computer vision, high-definition television, visual telephony, etc. make use of two-dimensional and in general, multidimensional discrete transforms.

== See also ==
- List of transforms § Discrete transforms
