= Stochastic thermodynamics =

Field of statistical mechanics

Stochastic thermodynamics is an emergent field of research in statistical mechanics that uses stochastic variables to better understand the non-equilibrium dynamics present in many microscopic systems such as colloidal particles, biopolymers (e.g. DNA, RNA, and proteins), enzymes, and molecular motors. (Note: See Seifert (2008), Seifert (2012) and Jarzynski (2011) for academic review articles of stochastic thermodynamics.)

== Overview ==
When a microscopic machine (e.g. a MEM) performs useful work, it generates heat and entropy as a byproduct of the process; however, it is also predicted that this machine will operate in "reverse" over appreciable short periods. That is, heat energy from the surroundings will be converted into useful work. For larger engines, this would be described as a violation of the second law of thermodynamics, as entropy is consumed rather than generated. Loschmidt's paradox states that in a time reversible system, for every trajectory there exists a time-reversed anti-trajectory. As the entropy production of a trajectory and its equal anti-trajectory are of identical magnitude but opposite sign, then, so the argument goes, one cannot prove that entropy production is positive.

For a long time, exact results in thermodynamics were only possible in linear systems capable of reaching equilibrium, leaving other questions like the Loschmidt paradox unsolved. During the last few decades fresh approaches have revealed general laws applicable to non-equilibrium system which are described by nonlinear equations, pushing the range of exact thermodynamic statements beyond the realm of traditional linear solutions. These exact results are particularly relevant for small systems where appreciable (typically non-Gaussian) fluctuations occur. Thanks to stochastic thermodynamics it is now possible to accurately predict distribution functions of thermodynamic quantities relating to exchanged heat, applied work or entropy production for these systems.

=== Fluctuation theorem ===
The mathematical resolution to Loschmidt's paradox is called the (steady state) fluctuation theorem (FT), which is a generalisation of the second law of thermodynamics. The FT shows that as a system gets larger or the trajectory duration becomes longer, entropy-consuming trajectories become more unlikely, and the expected second law behaviour is recovered.

The FT was first put forward by Evans et al. (1993) and much of the work done in developing and extending the theorem was accomplished by theoreticians and mathematicians interested in nonequilibrium statistical mechanics. (Note: Evan's original numerical analysis was shown heuristically and related to a thermostatted shear-driven fluid in contact with a heat bath. It was later mathematically proven for a large class of systems using concepts from chaotic dynamics by Gallavotti & Cohen (1995), for driven Langevin dynamics by Kurchan (1998) and for driven diffusive dynamics by Lebowitz & Spohn (1999). A variant, a transient fluctuation theorem valid for relaxation towards the steady state was later found by Evans & Searles (1994).)

The first observation and experimental proof of Evan's fluctuation theorem (FT) was performed by Wang et al. (2002)

=== Jarzynski equality ===
Seifert writes:

Jarzynski (1997a, 1997b) proved a remarkable relation which allows to express the free energy difference between two equilibrium systems by a nonlinear average over the work required to drive the system in a non-equilibrium process from one state to the other. By comparing probability distributions for the work spent in the original process with the time-reversed one, Crooks found a "refinement" of the Jarzynski relation (JR), now called the Crooks fluctuation theorem. Both, this relation and another refinement of the JR, the Hummer-Szabo relation became particularly useful for determining free energy differences and landscapes of biomolecules. These relations are the most prominent ones within a class of exact results (some of which found even earlier and then rediscovered) valid for non-equilibrium systems driven by time-dependent forces. A close analogy to the JR, which relates different equilibrium states, is the Hatano-Sasa relation that applies to transitions between two different non-equilibrium steady states.

This is shown to be a special case of a more general relation.

== History ==
Seifert writes:

Classical thermodynamics, at its heart, deals with general laws governing the transformations of a system, in particular, those involving the exchange of heat, work and matter with an environment. As a central result, total entropy production is identified that in any such process can never decrease, leading, inter alia, to fundamental limits on the efficiency of heat engines and refrigerators.

The thermodynamic characterisation of systems in equilibrium got its microscopic justification from equilibrium statistical mechanics which states that for a system in contact with a heat bath the probability to find it in any specific microstate is given by the Boltzmann factor. For small deviations from equilibrium, linear response theory allows to express transport properties caused by small external fields through equilibrium correlation functions. On a more phenomenological level, linear irreversible thermodynamics provides a relation between such transport coefficients and entropy production in terms of forces and fluxes. Beyond this linear response regime, for a long time, no universal exact results were available.

During the last 20 years fresh approaches have revealed general laws applicable to non-equilibrium system thus pushing the range of validity of exact thermodynamic statements beyond the realm of linear response deep into the genuine non-equilibrium region. These exact results, which become particularly relevant for small systems with appreciable (typically non-Gaussian) fluctuations, generically refer to distribution functions of thermodynamic quantities like exchanged heat, applied work or entropy production.

Stochastic thermodynamics combines the stochastic energetics introduced by Sekimoto (1998) with the idea that entropy can consistently be assigned to a single fluctuating trajectory.

== Open research ==
=== Quantum stochastic thermodynamics ===
Stochastic thermodynamics can be applied to driven (i.e. open) quantum systems whenever the effects of quantum coherence can be ignored. The dynamics of an open quantum system is then equivalent to a classical stochastic one. However, this is sometimes at the cost of requiring unrealistic measurements at the beginning and end of a process. (Note: See Esposito et al. (2009) and Campisi et al. (2011) for academic review articles on non-equilibrium quantum fluctuations)

Understanding non-equilibrium quantum thermodynamics more broadly is an important and active area of research. The efficiency of some computing and information theory tasks can be greatly enhanced when using quantum correlated states; quantum correlations can be used not only as a valuable resource in quantum computation, but also in the realm of quantum thermodynamics. New types of quantum devices in non-equilibrium states function very differently to their classical counterparts. For example, it has been theoretically shown that non-equilibrium quantum ratchet systems function far more efficiently then that predicted by classical thermodynamics. (Note: See for example Yukawa et al. (1997), Reimann et al. (1997), Tatara et al. (1998)) It has also been shown that quantum coherence can be used to enhance the efficiency of systems beyond the classical Carnot limit. This is because it could be possible to extract work, in the form of photons, from a single heat bath. Quantum coherence can be used in effect to play the role of Maxwell's demon though the broader information theory based interpretation of the second law of thermodynamics is not violated. (Note: See for example Scully (2001), Scully et al. (2003), Dillenschneider & Lutz (2009), Roßnagel et al. (2014), and Roßnagel et al. (2016))

Quantum versions of stochastic thermodynamics have been studied for some time (Note: See for example Yukawa (2000) and Mukamel (2003)) and the past few years have seen a surge of interest in this topic. Quantum mechanics involves profound issues around the interpretation of reality (e.g. the Copenhagen interpretation, many-worlds, de Broglie-Bohm theory etc. are all competing interpretations that try to explain the unintuitive results of quantum theory) . It is hoped that by trying to specify the quantum-mechanical definition of work, dealing with open quantum systems, analyzing exactly solvable models, or proposing and performing experiments to test non-equilibrium predictions, (Note: See for example Huber et al. (2008) and An et al. (2014)) important insights into the interpretation of quantum mechanics and the true nature of reality will be gained.

Applications of non-equilibrium work relations, like the Jarzynski equality, have recently been proposed for the purposes of detecting quantum entanglement (Hide & Vedral 2010) and to improving optimization problems (minimize or maximize a function of multivariables called the cost function) via quantum annealing (Ohzeki & Nishimori 2011).

=== Active baths ===
Until recently thermodynamics has only considered systems coupled to a thermal bath and, therefore, satisfying Boltzmann statistics. However, some systems do not satisfy these conditions and are far from equilibrium such as living matter, for which fluctuations are expected to be non-Gaussian.

Active particle systems are able to take energy from their environment and drive themselves far from equilibrium. An important example of active matter is constituted by objects capable of self propulsion. Thanks to this property, they feature a series of novel behaviours that are not attainable by matter at thermal equilibrium, including, for example, swarming and the emergence of other collective properties. A passive particle is considered in an active bath when it is in an environment where a wealth of active particles are present. These particles will exert nonthermal forces on the passive object so that it will experience non-thermal fluctuations and will behave widely different from a passive Brownian particle in a thermal bath. The presence of an active bath can significantly influence the microscopic thermodynamics of a particle. Experiments have suggested that the Jarzynski equality does not hold in some cases due to the presence of non-Boltzmann statistics in active baths. (Note: See for example Argun et al. (2016)) This observation points towards a new direction in the study of non-equilibrium statistical physics and stochastic thermodynamics, where also the environment itself is far from equilibrium.

Active baths are a question of particular importance in biochemistry. For example, biomolecules within cells are coupled with an active bath due to the presence of molecular motors within the cytoplasm, which leads to striking and largely not yet understood phenomena such as the emergence of anomalous diffusion (Barkai et al., 2012). Also, protein folding might be facilitated by the presence of active fluctuations (Harder et al., 2014b) and active matter dynamics could play a central role in several biological functions (Mallory et al., 2015; Shin et al., 2015; Suzuki et al., 2015). It is an open question to what degree stochastic thermodynamics can be applied to systems coupled to active baths.
