= Topological combinatorics =

Mathematical subject

The mathematical discipline of topological combinatorics is the application of topological and algebro-topological methods to solve problems in combinatorics.

== History ==
The discipline of combinatorial topology used combinatorial concepts in topology and in the early 20th century this turned into the field of algebraic topology.

In 1978 the situation was reversed—methods from algebraic topology were used to solve a problem in combinatorics—when László Lovász proved the Kneser conjecture, thus beginning the new field of topological combinatorics. Lovász's proof used the Borsuk–Ulam theorem and this theorem retains a prominent role in this new field. This theorem has many equivalent versions and analogs and has been used in the study of fair division problems.

In another application of homological methods to graph theory, Lovász proved both the undirected and directed versions of a conjecture of András Frank: Given a k-connected graph G, k points $v_1,\ldots,v_k \in V(G)$, and k positive integers $n_1,n_2,\ldots,n_k$ that sum up to $|V(G)|$, there exists a partition $\{V_1,\ldots,V_k\}$ of $V(G)$ such that $v_i \in V_i$, $|V_i|=n_i$, and $V_i$ spans a connected subgraph.

In 1987 the necklace splitting problem was solved by Noga Alon using the Borsuk–Ulam theorem. It has also been used to study complexity problems in linear decision tree algorithms and the Aanderaa–Karp–Rosenberg conjecture. Other areas include topology of partially ordered sets and Bruhat orders.

Additionally, methods from differential topology now have a combinatorial analog in discrete Morse theory.

== See also ==
- Sperner's lemma
- Discrete exterior calculus
- Topological graph theory
- Combinatorial topology
- Finite topological space
