= Mariangiola =

Mariangiola is a given name. Notable people with the given name include:

- Mariangiola Criscuolo (c. 1548–1630), Italian painter
- Mariangiola Dezani-Ciancaglini (born 1946), Italian logician and theoretical computer scientist
