= Böhm tree =

Mathematical object for the lambda calculus

In the study of denotational semantics of the lambda calculus, Böhm trees, (Note: per Sangiorgi & Walker (2003, p. 493), introduced in Barendregt (1977) and named after a theorem of Corrado Böhm) Lévy-Longo trees, (Note: coined in Ong (1988), per Sangiorgi & Walker (2003, p. 511)) and Berarducci trees are (potentially infinite) tree-like mathematical objects that capture the "meaning" of a term up to some set of "meaningless" terms.

== Motivation ==
A simple way to read the meaning of a computation is to consider it as a mechanical procedure consisting of a finite number of steps that, when completed, yields a result. In particular, considering the lambda calculus as a rewriting system, each beta reduction step is a rewrite step, and once there are no further beta reductions the term is in normal form. We could thus, naively following Church's suggestion, say the meaning of a term is its normal form, and that terms without a normal form are meaningless. For example, the meanings of $\mathbf{I} = \lambda x.x$ and $\mathbf{II}$ are both $\mathbf{I}$. This works for any strongly normalizing subset of the lambda calculus, such as a typed lambda calculus.

This naive assignment of meaning is however inadequate for the full lambda calculus. The term $\mathbf{\Omega} = (\lambda x.xx)(\lambda x.xx)$ does not have a normal form, and similarly the term $\mathbf{X} = \lambda x.x\mathbf{\Omega}$ does not have a normal form. But the application $\mathbf{\Omega}(\mathbf{KI})$, where $\mathbf{K}$ denotes the standard lambda term $\lambda x.\lambda y.x$, reduces only to itself, whereas the application $\mathbf{X}(\mathbf{KI})$ reduces with normal order reduction to $\mathbf{I}$, hence has a meaning. We thus see that not all non-normalizing terms are equivalent. We would like to say that $\mathbf{\Omega}$ is less meaningful than $\mathbf{X}$ because applying $\mathbf{X}$ to a term can produce a result but applying $\mathbf{\Omega}$ cannot.

Böhm trees may also be applied in the context of the infinitary lambda calculus, which includes infinitely large terms. In this context, the term $\mathbf{NN}$, where $\mathbf{N} = \lambda x.\mathbf{I}(xx)$, reduces to both to $\mathbf{I}(\mathbf{I}(\dots))$ and $\mathbf{\Omega}$, hence there are also issues with confluence of normalization.

== Sets of meaningless terms ==
The general construction is parameterized by a set $U$ of meaningless terms, which is required to satisfy the following axioms:

- Root-activeness: Every root-active term is in $U$. A term $M$ is root-active if for all $M \stackrel{*}{\to} N$ there exists a redex $(\lambda x.P)Q$ such that $N \stackrel{*}{\to} (\lambda x.P)Q$.
- Closure under β-reduction: For all $M \in U$, if $M \stackrel{*}{\to} N$ then $N \in U$.
- Closure under substitution: For all $M \in U$ and substitutions $\sigma$, $M\sigma \in U$.
- Overlap: For all $\lambda x.M \in U$, $(\lambda x.M )N \in U$ .
- Indiscernibility: For all $M, N$, if $N$ can be obtained from $M$ by replacing a set of pairwise disjoint subterms in $U$ with other terms of $U$, then $M \in U$ if and only if $N \in U$.
- Closure under β-expansion. For all $N \in U$, if $M \stackrel{*}{\to} N$, then $M \in U$. Some definitions leave this out, but it is useful.

There are infinitely many sets of meaningless terms, but the ones most common in the literature are:

- The set of terms without head normal form
- The set of terms without weak head normal form
- The set of root-active terms, i.e. the terms without top normal form or root normal form. Since root-activeness is assumed, this is the smallest set of meaningless terms.

Note that $\mathbf{\Omega}$ is root-active and therefore $\mathbf{\Omega} \in U$ for every set of meaningless terms $U$.

== λ⊥-terms ==
The set of λ-terms with ⊥ (abbreviated λ⊥-terms) is defined coinductively by the grammar $M = \bot \mid x \mid (\lambda x. M) \mid (M M)$. This corresponds to the standard infinitary lambda calculus plus terms containing $\bot$. Beta-reduction on this set is defined in the standard way. Given a set of meaningless terms $U$, we also define a reduction to bottom: if $M[\bot \mapsto \mathbf{\Omega}] \in U$ and $M \neq \bot$, then $M \to \bot$. The λ⊥-terms are then considered as a rewriting system with these two rules; thanks to the definition of meaningless terms this rewriting system is confluent and normalizing.

The Böhm-like "tree" for a term may then be obtained as the normal form of the term in this system, possibly in an infinitary "in the limit" sense if the term expands infinitely.

=== Böhm trees ===
The Böhm trees are obtained by considering the λ⊥-terms where the set of meaningless terms consists of those without head normal form. More explicitly, the Böhm tree BT(M) of a lambda term M can be computed as follows:

1. BT(M) is $\bot$, if M has no head normal form
2. $\mathrm{BT}(M) = \lambda x_1.\lambda x_2.\ldots\lambda x_n.y \mathrm{BT}(M_1) \ldots \mathrm{BT}(M_m)$, if $M$ reduces in a finite number of steps to the head normal form $\lambda x_1.\lambda x_2.\ldots\lambda x_n.y M_1 \ldots M_m$

For example, $\mathrm{BT}(\mathbf{\Omega}) = \bot$, $\mathrm{BT}(\mathbf{I}) = \mathbf{I}$ and $\mathrm{BT}(\lambda x.x\mathbf{\Omega}) = \lambda x.x\bot$.

Determining whether a term has a head normal form is an undecidable problem. Barendregt introduced a notion of an "effective" Böhm tree that is computable, with the only difference being that terms with no head normal form are not marked with $\bot$.

Note that computing the Böhm tree is similar to finding a normal form for M. If M has a normal form, the Böhm tree is finite and has a simple correspondence to the normal form. If M does not have a normal form, normalization may "grow" some subtrees infinitely, or it may get "stuck in a loop" attempting to produce a result for part of the tree, which produce infinitary trees and meaningless terms respectively. Since the Böhm tree may be infinite the procedure should be understood as being applied co-recursively or as taking the limit of an infinite series of approximations.

=== Lévy-Longo trees ===
The Lévy-Longo trees are obtained by considering the λ⊥-terms where the set of meaningless terms consists of those without weak head normal form. More explicitly, the Lévy-Longo tree LLT(M) of a lambda term M can be computed as follows:

1. LLT(M) is $\bot$, if M has no weak head normal form.
2. If $M$ reduces to the weak head normal form $y M_1 \ldots M_m$, then $\mathrm{LLT}(M) = y \mathrm{LLT}(M_1) \ldots \mathrm{LLT}(M_m)$.
3. If $M$ reduces to the weak head normal form $\lambda x.N$, then $\mathrm{LLT}(M) = \lambda x.\mathrm{LLT}(N)$/

=== Berarducci trees ===
The Berarducci trees are obtained by considering the λ⊥-terms where the set of meaningless terms consists of the root-active terms. More explicitly, the Berarducci tree BerT(M) of a lambda term M can be computed as follows:

1. BerT(M) is $\bot$, if M is root-active.
2. If $M$ reduces to a term $\lambda x.N$, then $\mathrm{BerT}(M) = \lambda x.\mathrm{BerT}(N)$.
3. If $M$ reduces to a term $N P$ where $N$ does not reduce to any abstraction $\lambda x. Q$, then $\mathrm{BerT}(M) = \mathrm{BerT}(N) \mathrm{BerT}(P)$.
