= Subject reduction =

In type theory, a type system has the property of subject reduction (also subject evaluation, type preservation or simply preservation) if evaluation of expressions does not cause their type to change. Formally, if ⊢ e_{1} : τ and e_{1} → e_{2} then ⊢ e_{2} : τ. Intuitively, this means one would not like to write an expression, in say Haskell, of type Int, and have it evaluate to a value v, only to find out that v is a string.

Together with progress, it is an important meta-theoretical property for establishing type soundness of a type system.

The opposite property, if Γ ⊢ e_{2} : τ and e_{1} → e_{2} then Γ ⊢ e_{1} : τ, is called subject expansion. It often does not hold as evaluation can erase ill-typed sub-terms of an expression, resulting in a well-typed one.
