= Mariangiola Dezani-Ciancaglini =

Italian logician and theoretical computer scientist

Mariangiola Dezani-Ciancaglini (born 22 December 1946) is an Italian logician and theoretical computer scientist whose research topics include type theory and intersection type disciplines, lambda calculus, and programming language semantics. She is a professor emerita at the University of Turin.

== Education and career ==
She was born on 22 December 1946 in Turin. After earning a master's degree in physics at the University of Turin in 1970, and working as a researcher in Turin as a CNR fellow, she became an assistant professor of computer science at University of Turin in 1972, and full professor in 1981.

While continuing as a professor, she earned a Ph.D. from the Catholic University of Nijmegen in the Netherlands in 1996. Her dissertation, Logical Semantics for Concurrent Lambda-Calculus, was jointly promoted by Henk Barendregt and Corrado Böhm.

She served as dean of computer science at the University of Turin from 2005 to 2008, and retired to become a professor emerita in 2018.

== Recognition ==
She was elected to the Academia Europaea in 1993. In 2015 she was named a Fellow of the European Association for Theoretical Computer Science "for distinguished and seminal achievements in formal methods and foundations of programming languages, introducing or developing new type systems for the lambda-calculus as well as for the pi-calculus and related calculi".
