= Natural pseudodistance =

In size theory, the natural pseudodistance between two size pairs $(M,\varphi:M\to \mathbb{R})\$, $(N,\psi:N\to \mathbb{R})\$ is the value $\inf_h \|\varphi-\psi\circ h\|_\infty\$, where $h\$ varies in the set of all homeomorphisms from the manifold $M\$ to the manifold $N\$ and $\|\cdot\|_\infty\$ is the supremum norm. If $M\$ and $N\$ are not homeomorphic, then the natural pseudodistance is defined to be $\infty\$. It is usually assumed that $M\$, $N\$ are $C^1\$ closed manifolds and the measuring functions $\varphi,\psi\$ are $C^1\$. Put another way, the natural pseudodistance measures the infimum of the change of the measuring function induced by the homeomorphisms from $M\$ to $N\$.

The concept of natural pseudodistance can be easily extended to size pairs where the measuring function $\varphi\$ takes values in $\mathbb{R}^m\$ . When $M=N\$, the group $H\$ of all homeomorphisms of $M\$ can be replaced in the definition of natural pseudodistance by a subgroup $G\$ of $H\$, so obtaining the concept of natural pseudodistance with respect to the group $G\$. Lower bounds and approximations of the natural pseudodistance with respect to the group $G\$ can be obtained both by means of $G$-invariant persistent homology and by combining classical persistent homology with the use of G-equivariant non-expansive operators.

== Main properties ==
It can be proved that the natural pseudodistance always equals the Euclidean distance between two critical values of the measuring functions (possibly, of the same measuring function) divided by a suitable positive integer $k\$. If $M\$ and $N\$ are surfaces, the number $k\$ can be assumed to be $1\$, $2\$ or $3\$. If $M\$ and $N\$ are curves, the number $k\$ can be assumed to be $1\$ or $2\$. If an optimal homeomorphism $\bar h\$ exists (i.e., $\|\varphi-\psi\circ \bar h\|_\infty=\inf_h \|\varphi-\psi\circ h\|_\infty\$), then $k\$ can be assumed to be $1\$. The research concerning optimal homeomorphisms is still at its very beginning .

== See also ==
- Fréchet distance
- Size function
- Size functor
- Size homotopy group
