= TDL =

TDL may refer to:

== Businesses and organizations ==
- Technical Design Labs, a former microcomputer- and software company
- Texas Digital Library, a consortium of institutions
- TDL Group, former company name of Tim Hortons

== Places ==
- Tokyo Disneyland, Japan
- Tandil Airport (IATA code), Argentina
- Tundla Junction railway station (Station code), India

== Other uses ==
- To-do list
- Tactical Data Link, in military communication
- Tomodachi Life (video game), a 2013 life simulation video game
- Toxic Dose Low, in toxicology
- Topological deep learning
- Sur language (ISO 639-3 code: tdl), a Plateau language of Nigeria

== See also ==
- Temporal difference learning (TD), a prediction method
- Tunneled Direct Link Setup (TDLS)
- Two Dimensional Logarithmic Search (TDLS)
- Tunable diode laser absorption spectroscopy (TDLAS)
