= Persistent Betti number =

In persistent homology, a persistent Betti number is a multiscale analog of a Betti number that tracks the number of topological features that persist over multiple scale parameters in a filtration. Whereas the classical $n^{th}$ Betti number equals the rank of the $n^{th}$ homology group, the $n^{th}$ persistent Betti number is the rank of the $n^{th}$ persistent homology group. The concept of a persistent Betti number was introduced by Herbert Edelsbrunner, David Letscher, and Afra Zomorodian in the 2002 paper Topological Persistence and Simplification, one of the seminal papers in the field of persistent homology and topological data analysis. Applications of the persistent Betti number appear in a variety of fields including data analysis, machine learning, and physics.

== Definition ==
Let $K$ be a simplicial complex, and let $f:K \to \mathbb R$ be a monotonic, i.e., non-decreasing function. Requiring monotonicity guarantees that the sublevel set $K(a) := f^{-1} (-\infty, a]$ is a subcomplex of $K$ for all $a \in \mathbb R$. Letting the parameter $a$ vary, we can arrange these subcomplexes into a nested sequence $\emptyset = K_0 \subseteq K_1 \subseteq \cdots \subseteq K_n = K$ for some natural number $n$. This sequences defines a filtration on the complex $K$.

Persistent homology concerns itself with the evolution of topological features across a filtration. To that end, by taking the $p^{th}$ homology group of every complex in the filtration we obtain a sequence of homology groups $0 = H_p (K_0) \to H_p (K_1) \to \cdots \to H_p (K_n) = H_p (K)$ that are connected by homomorphisms induced by the inclusion maps in the filtration. When applying homology over a field, we get a sequence of vector spaces and linear maps commonly known as a persistence module.

In order to track the evolution of homological features as opposed to the static topological information at each individual index, one needs to count only the number of nontrivial homology classes that persist in the filtration, i.e., that remain nontrivial across multiple scale parameters.

For each $i \leq j$, let $f_p^{i,j}$ denote the induced homomorphism $H_p (K_i) \to H_p (K_j)$. Then the $p^{th}$ persistent homology groups are defined to be the images of each induced map. Namely, $H_p^{i,j} := \operatorname{im} f_p^{i,j}$ for all $0 \leq i \leq j \leq n$.

In parallel to the classical Betti number, the $p^{th}$ persistent Betti numbers are precisely the ranks of the $p^{th}$ persistent homology groups, given by the definition $\beta_p^{i,j} := \operatorname{rank} H_p^{i,j}$.
