= Persistent homology group =

Multiscale analog of homology group

In persistent homology, a persistent homology group is a multiscale analog of a homology group that captures information about the evolution of topological features across a filtration of spaces. While the ordinary homology group represents nontrivial homology classes of an individual topological space, the persistent homology group tracks only those classes that remain nontrivial across multiple parameters in the underlying filtration. Analogous to the ordinary Betti number, the ranks of the persistent homology groups are known as the persistent Betti numbers. Persistent homology groups were first introduced by Herbert Edelsbrunner, David Letscher, and Afra Zomorodian in a 2002 paper Topological Persistence and Simplification, one of the foundational papers in the fields of persistent homology and topological data analysis, based largely on the persistence barcodes and the persistence algorithm, that were first described by Serguei Barannikov in the 1994 paper. Since then, the study of persistent homology groups has led to applications in data science, machine learning, materials science, biology, and economics.

== Definition ==
Let $K$ be a simplicial complex, and let $f: K \to \mathbb R$ be a real-valued monotonic function. Then for some values $a_0 < a_1 < \cdots < a_n \in \mathbb R$ the sublevel-sets $K(a) := f^{-1}(-\infty, a]$ yield a sequence of nested subcomplexes $\emptyset = K_0 \subseteq K_1 \subseteq \cdots \subseteq K_n = K$ known as a filtration of $K$.

Applying $p^{th}$ homology to each complex yields a sequence of homology groups $0 = H_p (K_0) \to H_p (K_1) \to \cdots \to H_p (K_n) = H_p (K)$ connected by homomorphisms induced by the inclusion maps of the underlying filtration. When homology is taken over a field, we get a sequence of vector spaces and linear maps known as a persistence module.

Let $f_p^{i,j}: H_p (K_i) \to H_p (K_j)$ be the homomorphism induced by the inclusion $K_i \hookrightarrow K_j$. Then the $p^{th}$ persistent homology groups are defined as the images $H_p^{i,j} := \operatorname{im} f_p^{i,j}$ for all $1 \leq i \leq j \leq n$. In particular, the persistent homology group $H_p^{i,i} = H_p (K_i)$.

More precisely, the $p^{th}$ persistent homology group can be defined as $H_p^{i,j} = Z_p (K_i) / \left( B_p (K_j) \cap Z_p(K_i) \right)$, where $Z_p(K_\bullet)$ and $B_p(K_\bullet)$ are the standard p-cycle and p-boundary groups, respectively.

== Birth and death of homology classes ==
Sometimes the elements of $H_p^{i,j}$ are described as the homology classes that are "born" at or before $K_i$ and that have not yet "died" entering $K_j$. These notions can be made precise as follows. A homology class $\gamma \in H_p (K_i)$ is said to be born at $K_i$ if it is not contained in the image of the previous persistent homology group, i.e., $\gamma \notin H_p^{i-1, i}$. Conversely, $\gamma$ is said to die entering $K_j$ if $\gamma$ is subsumed (i.e., merges with) another older class as the sequence proceeds from $K_{j-1} \to K_j$. That is to say, $f_p^{i,j-1} (\gamma) \notin H_p^{i-1,j-1}$ but $f_p^{i,j} (\gamma) \in H_p^{i-1,j}$. The determination that an older class persists if it merges with a younger class, instead of the other way around, is sometimes known as the Elder Rule.

The indices $i,j$ at which a homology class $\gamma$ is born and dies entering are known as the birth and death indices of $\gamma$. The difference $j-i$ is known as the index persistence of $\gamma$, while the corresponding difference $a_j - a_i$ in function values corresponding to those indices is known as the persistence of $\gamma$ . If there exists no index at which $\gamma$ dies, it is assigned an infinite death index. Thus, the persistence of each class can be represented as an interval in the extended real line $\mathbb R \cup \{\pm \infty\}$ of either the form $[a_i, a_j)$ or $[a_i', \infty)$. Since, in the case of an infinite field, the infinite number of classes always have the same persistence, the collection over all classes of such intervals does not give meaningful multiplicities for a multiset of intervals. Instead, such multiplicities and a multiset of intervals in the extended real line are given by the structure theorem of persistence homology. This multiset is known as the persistence barcode.

== Canonical form ==
Concretely, the structure theorem states that for any filtered complex over a field $F$, there exists a linear transformation that preserves the filtration and converts the filtered complex into so called canonical form, a canonically defined direct sum of filtered complexes of two types: two-dimensional complexes with trivial homology $d(e_{a_j})=e_{a_i}$ and one-dimensional complexes with trivial differential $d(e_{a'_i})=0$.

== Persistence diagram ==
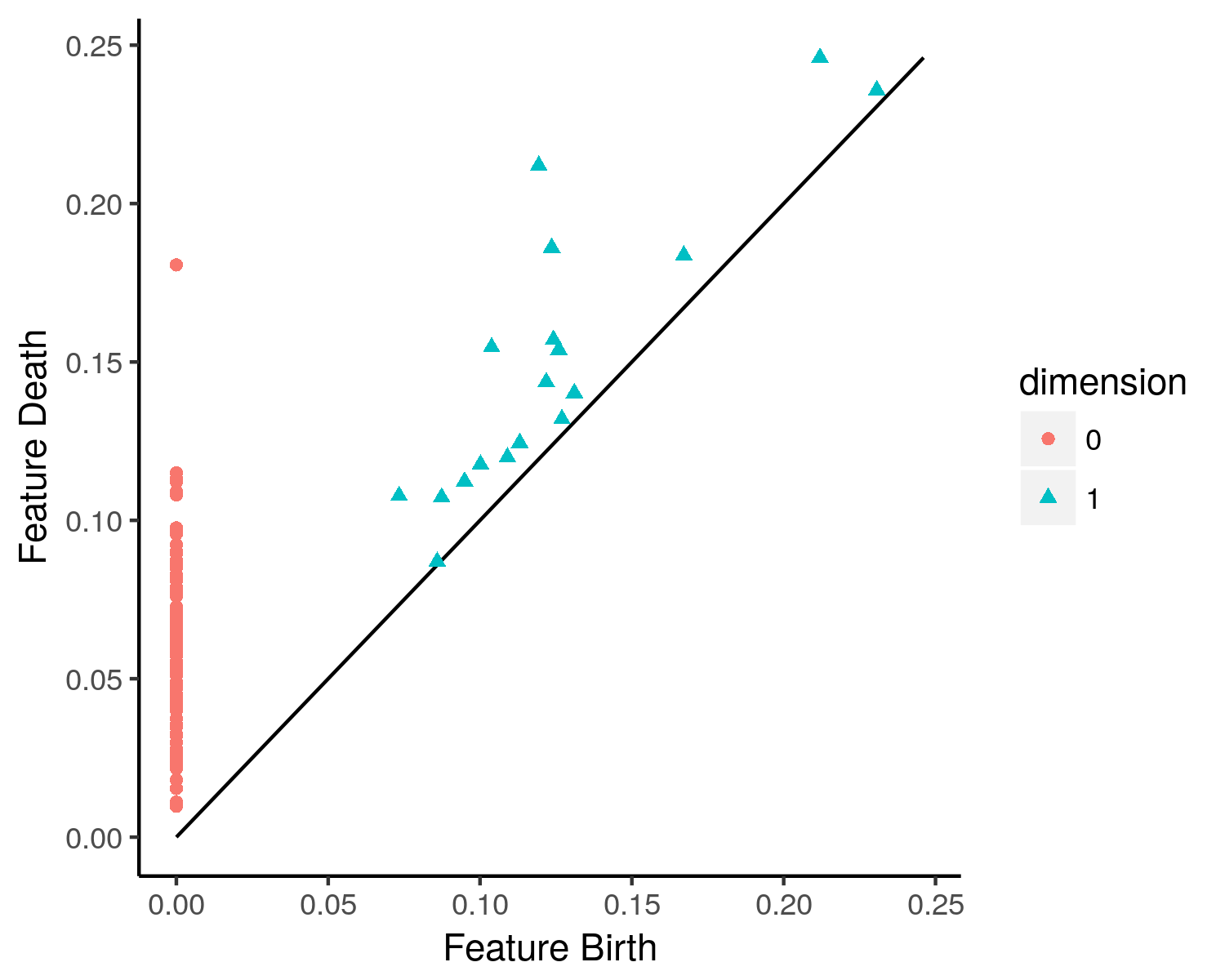
An example of a persistence diagram

Geometrically, a barcode can be plotted as a multiset of points (with possibly infinite coordinates) $(a_i, a_j)$ in the extended plane $\left( \mathbb R \cup \{\pm \infty \} \right)^2$. By the above definitions, each point will lie above the diagonal, and the distance to the diagonal is exactly equal to the persistence of the corresponding class times $\frac{1}{\sqrt 2}$. This construction is known as the persistence diagram, and it provides a way of visualizing the structure of the persistence of homology classes in the sequence of persistent homology groups.
