= Vanessa Robins =

Australian mathematician

Vanessa Robins is an Australian applied mathematician whose research interests include computational topology, image processing, and the structure of granular materials. She is a fellow in the departments of applied mathematics and theoretical physics at Australian National University, where she was ARC Future Fellow from 2014 to 2019.

== Education ==
Robins earned a bachelor's degree in mathematics at Australian National University in 1994. She completed a PhD at the University of Colorado Boulder in 2000. Her dissertation, Computational Topology at Multiple Resolutions: Foundations and Applications to Fractals and Dynamics, was jointly supervised by James D. Meiss and Elizabeth Bradley.

== Contributions ==
One of Robins's publications, from 1999, is one of the three works that independently introduced persistent homology in topological data analysis. As well as working on mathematical research, she has collaborated with artist Julie Brooke, of the Australian National University School of Art & Design, on the mathematical visualization of topological surfaces.
