= Persistence barcode =

Technique in topological data analysis

In topological data analysis, a persistence barcode, sometimes shortened to barcode, is an algebraic invariant associated with a filtered chain complex or a persistence module that characterizes the stability of topological features throughout a growing family of spaces. Formally, a persistence barcode consists of a multiset of intervals in the extended real line, where the length of each interval corresponds to the lifetime of a topological feature in a filtration, usually built on a point cloud, a graph, a function, or, more generally, a simplicial complex or a chain complex. Generally, longer intervals in a barcode correspond to more robust features, whereas shorter intervals are more likely to be noise in the data. A persistence barcode is a complete invariant that captures all the topological information in a filtration. In algebraic topology, the persistence barcodes were first introduced by Sergey Barannikov in 1994 as the "canonical forms" invariants consisting of a multiset of line segments with ends on two parallel lines, and later, in geometry processing, by Gunnar Carlsson et al. in 2004.

== Definition ==
Let $\mathbb F$ be a fixed field. Consider a real-valued function on a chain complex $f:K \rightarrow \mathbb{R}$ compatible with the differential, so that $f(\sigma_i) \leq f(\tau)$ whenever $\partial\tau=\sum_i\sigma_i$ in $K$. Then for every $a \in \mathbb{R}$ the sublevel set $K_a=f^{-1}((-\infty, a])$ is a subcomplex of K, and the values of $f$ on the generators in $K$ define a filtration (which is in practice always finite):

$$\emptyset = K_0 \subseteq K_1 \subseteq \cdots \subseteq K_n = K$$.

Then, the filtered complexes classification theorem states that for any filtered chain complex over $\mathbb F$, there exists a linear transformation that preserves the filtration and brings the filtered complex into so called canonical form, a canonically defined direct sum of filtered complexes of two types: two-dimensional complexes with trivial homology $d(e_{a_j})=e_{a_i}$ and one-dimensional complexes with trivial differential $d(e_{a'_i})=0$. The multiset $\mathcal B_f$ of the intervals $[a_i, a_j)$ or $[a_i', \infty)$ describing the canonical form, is called the barcode, and it is the complete invariant of the filtered chain complex.

The concept of a persistence module is intimately linked to the notion of a filtered chain complex. A persistence module $M$ indexed over $\mathbb R$ consists of a family of $\mathbb F$-vector spaces $\{ M_t \}_{t \in \mathbb R}$ and linear maps $\varphi_{s,t} : M_s \to M_t$ for each $s \leq t$ such that $\varphi_{s,t} \circ \varphi_{r,s} = \varphi_{r,t}$ for all $r \leq s \leq t$. This construction is not specific to $\mathbb R$; indeed, it works identically with any totally-ordered set.

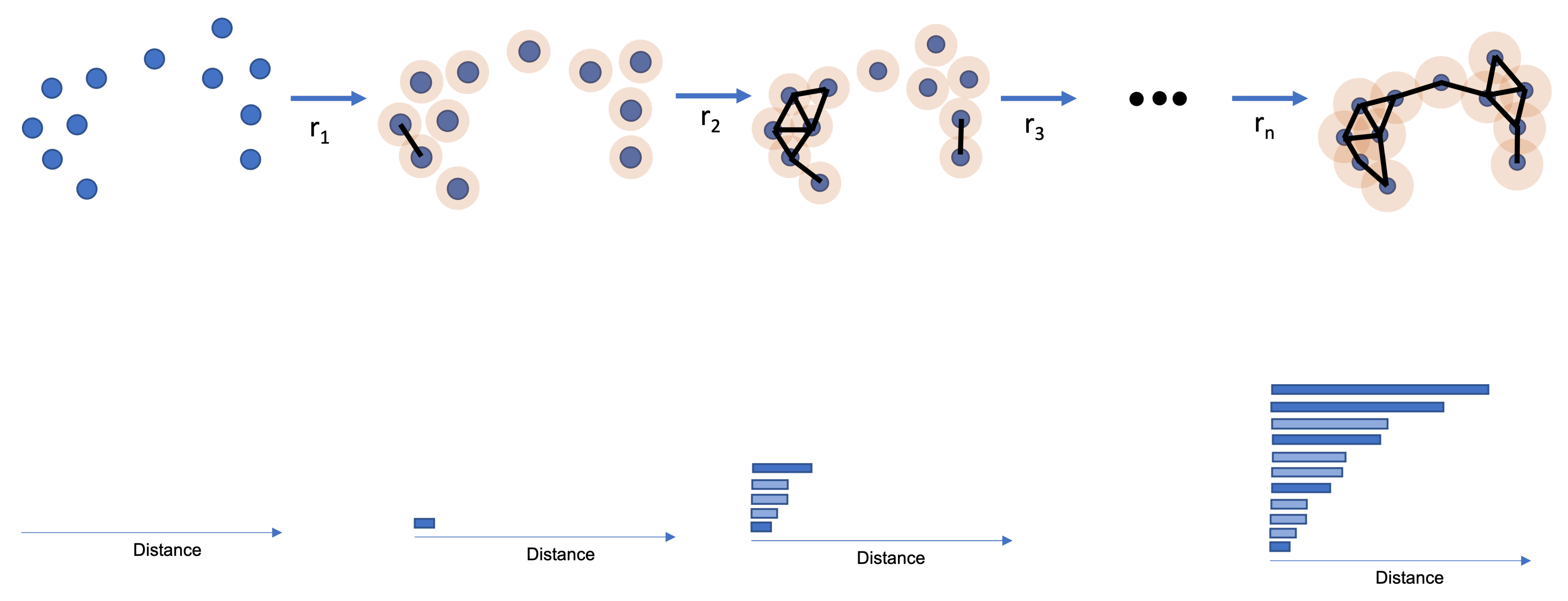
A series of four nested simplicial complexes and the 0-dimensional persistence barcode of the resulting filtration.

A persistence module $M$ is said to be of finite type if it contains a finite number of unique finite-dimensional vector spaces. The latter condition is sometimes referred to as pointwise finite-dimensional.

Let $I$ be an interval in $\mathbb R$. Define a persistence module $Q(I)$ via
$$Q(I_s)=
\begin{cases}
0, & \text{if } s\notin I;\\
\mathbb F, & \text{otherwise}
\end{cases}$$
, where the linear maps are the identity map inside the interval. The module $Q(I)$ is sometimes referred to as an interval module.

Then for any $\mathbb R$-indexed persistence module $M$ of finite type, there exists a multiset $\mathcal B_M$ of intervals such that $M \cong \bigoplus_{I \in \mathcal B_M}Q(I)$, where the direct sum of persistence modules is carried out index-wise. The multiset $\mathcal B_M$ is called the barcode of $M$, and it is unique up to a reordering of the intervals.

This result was extended to the case of pointwise finite-dimensional persistence modules indexed over an arbitrary totally-ordered set by William Crawley-Boevey and Magnus Botnan in 2020, building upon known results from the structure theorem for finitely generated modules over a PID, as well as the work of Cary Webb for the case of the integers.
