= Fréchet surface =

In mathematics, a Fréchet surface is an equivalence class of parametrized surfaces in a metric space. In other words, a Fréchet surface is a way of thinking about surfaces independently of how they are "written down" (parametrized). The concept is named after the French mathematician Maurice Fréchet.

== Definitions ==
Let $M$ be a compact 2-dimensional manifold, either closed or with boundary, and let $(X, d)$ be a metric space. A parametrized surface in $X$ is a map
$$f : M \to X$$
that is continuous with respect to the topology on $M$ and the metric topology on $X.$ Let
$$\rho(f, g) = \inf_{\sigma} \max_{x \in M} d(f(x), g(\sigma(x))),$$
where the infimum is taken over all homeomorphisms $\sigma$ of $M$ to itself. Call two parametrized surfaces $f$ and $f$ in $X$ equivalent if and only if
$$\rho(f, g) = 0.$$

An equivalence class $[f]$ of parametrized surfaces under this notion of equivalence is called a Fréchet surface; each of the parametrized surfaces in this equivalence class is called a parametrization of the Fréchet surface $[f].$

== Properties ==
Many properties of parametrized surfaces are actually properties of the Fréchet surface, that is, of the whole equivalence class, and not of any particular parametrization.

For example, given two Fréchet surfaces, the value of $\rho(f, g)$ is independent of the choice of the parametrizations $f$ and $g,$ and is called the Fréchet distance between the Fréchet surfaces.
