= Size theory =

In mathematics, size theory studies the properties of topological spaces endowed with $\mathbb{R}^k$-valued functions, with respect to the change of these functions. More formally, the subject of size theory is the study of the natural pseudodistance between size pairs. A survey of size theory can be found in .

== History and applications ==
The beginning of size theory is rooted in the concept of size function, introduced by Frosini. Size functions have been initially used as a mathematical tool for shape comparison in computer vision and pattern recognition.

An extension of the concept of size function to algebraic topology was made in the 1999 Frosini and Mulazzani paper where size homotopy groups were introduced, together with the natural pseudodistance for $\mathbb{R}^k$-valued functions. An extension to homology theory (the size functor) was introduced in 2001. The size homotopy group and the size functor are strictly related to the concept of persistent homology group studied in persistent homology. It is worth to point out that the size function is the rank of the $0$-th persistent homology group, while the relation between the persistent homology group and the size homotopy group is analogous to the one existing between homology groups and homotopy groups.

In size theory, size functions and size homotopy groups are seen as tools to compute lower bounds for the natural pseudodistance. Actually, the following link exists between the values taken by the size functions $\ell_{(N,\psi)}(\bar x,\bar y)$, $\ell_{(M,\varphi)}(\tilde x,\tilde y)$ and the natural pseudodistance $d((M,\varphi),(N,\psi))$ between the size pairs $(M,\varphi),\ (N,\psi)$ ,

$$\text{If }\ell_{(N,\psi)}(\bar x,\bar y)>\ell_{(M,\varphi)}(\tilde x,\tilde y)\text{ then }d((M,\varphi),(N,\psi))\ge \min\{\tilde x-\bar x,\bar y-\tilde y\}.$$

An analogous result holds for size homotopy group.

The attempt to generalize size theory and the concept of natural pseudodistance to norms that are different from the supremum norm has led to the study of other reparameterization invariant norms.

== See also ==
- Size function
- Natural pseudodistance
- Size functor
- Size homotopy group
- Size pair
- Matching distance
