= Size homotopy group =

The concept of size homotopy group is analogous in size theory of the classical concept of homotopy group. In order to give its definition, let us assume that a size pair $(M,\varphi)$ is given, where $M$ is a closed manifold of class $C^0\$ and $\varphi:M\to \mathbb{R}^k$ is a continuous function. Consider the lexicographical order $\preceq$ on $\mathbb{R}^k$ defined by setting $(x_1,\ldots,x_k)\preceq(y_1,\ldots,y_k)\$ if and only if $x_1 \le y_1,\ldots, x_k \le y_k$. For every $Y\in\mathbb{R}^k$ set $M_{Y}=\{Z\in\mathbb{R}^k:Z\preceq Y\}$.

Assume that $P\in M_X\$ and $X\preceq Y\$. If $\alpha\$, $\beta\$ are two paths from $P\$ to $P\$ and a homotopy from $\alpha\$ to $\beta\$, based at $P\$, exists in the topological space $M_{Y}\$, then we write $\alpha \approx_{Y}\beta\$. The first size homotopy group of the size pair $(M,\varphi)\$ computed at $(X,Y)\$ is defined to be the quotient set of the set of all paths from $P\$ to $P\$ in $M_X\$ with respect to the equivalence relation $\approx_{Y}\$, endowed with the operation induced by the usual composition of based loops.

In other words, the first size homotopy group of the size pair $(M,\varphi)\$ computed at $(X,Y)\$ and $P\$ is the image $h_{XY}(\pi_1(M_X,P))\$ of the first homotopy group $\pi_1(M_X,P)\$ with base point $P\$ of the topological space $M_X\$, when $h_{XY}\$ is the homomorphism induced by the inclusion of $M_X\$ in $M_Y\$.

The $n$-th size homotopy group is obtained by substituting the loops based at $P\$ with the continuous functions $\alpha:S^n\to M\$ taking a fixed point of $S^n\$ to $P\$, as happens when higher homotopy groups are defined.

== See also ==
- Size function
- Size functor
- Size pair
- Natural pseudodistance
