= Algebraic data type =

Data type defined by combining other types

In computer programming, especially in functional programming and type theory, an algebraic data type (ADT) is a composite data type, i.e. a type formed by combining other types.

An algebraic data type is defined by two key constructions: a sum and a product. These are sometimes referred to as "OR" and "AND" types.

A sum type is a choice between possibilities. The value of a sum type can match one of several defined variants. For example, a type representing the state of a traffic light could be either Red, Amber, or Green. A shape type could be either a Circle (which stores a radius) or a Square (which stores a width). In formal terms, these variants are known as tagged unions or disjoint unions. Each variant has a name, called a constructor, which can also carry data. Enumerated types are a simple form of sum type where the constructors carry no data.

A product type combines types together. A value of a product type will contain a value for each of its component types. For example, a Point type might be defined to contain an x coordinate (an integer) and a y coordinate (also an integer). Formal examples of product types include tuples and records. The set of all possible values of a product type is the Cartesian product of the sets of its component types.

Values of algebraic data types are typically handled using pattern matching. This feature allows a programmer to check which constructor a value was made with and extract the data it contains in a convenient and type-safe way.

== History ==
Algebraic data types were introduced in Hope, a small functional programming language developed in the 1970s at the University of Edinburgh.

== Examples ==
=== Singly linked list ===
One of the most common examples of an algebraic data type is the singly linked list. A list type is a sum type with two variants, Nil for an empty list and Cons x xs for the combination of a new element x with a list xs to create a new list. Here is an example of how a singly linked list would be declared in Haskell:

data List a = Nil | Cons a (List a)

or

data [] a = [] | a : [a]

Cons is an abbreviation of construct. Many languages have special syntax for lists defined in this way. For example, Haskell and ML use [] for Nil, : or :: for Cons, respectively, and square brackets for entire lists. So Cons 1 (Cons 2 (Cons 3 Nil)) would normally be written as 1:2:3:[] or [1,2,3] in Haskell, or as 1::2::3::[] or [1,2,3] in ML.

=== Binary tree ===
For a slightly more complex example, binary trees may be implemented in Haskell as follows:

data Tree = Empty
          | Leaf Int
          | Node Int Tree Tree

or

data BinaryTree a = BTNil
                  | BTNode a (BinaryTree a) (BinaryTree a)

Here, Empty represents an empty tree, Leaf represents a leaf node, and Node organizes the data into branches.

In most languages that support algebraic data types, it is possible to define parametric types. Examples are given later in this article.

Somewhat similar to a function, a data constructor is applied to arguments of an appropriate type, yielding an instance of the data type to which the type constructor belongs. For example, the data constructor Leaf is logically a function Int -> Tree, meaning that giving an integer as an argument to Leaf produces a value of the type Tree. As Node takes two arguments of the type Tree itself, the datatype is recursive.

Operations on algebraic data types can be defined by using pattern matching to retrieve the arguments. For example, consider a function to find the depth of a Tree, given here in Haskell:

depth :: Tree -> Int
depth Empty = 0
depth (Leaf n) = 1
depth (Node n l r) = 1 + max (depth l) (depth r)

Thus, a Tree given to depth can be constructed using any of Empty, Leaf, or Node and must be matched for any of them respectively to deal with all cases. In case of Node, the pattern extracts the subtrees l and r for further processing.

=== Abstract syntax ===
Algebraic data types are highly suited to implementing abstract syntax. For example, the following algebraic data type describes a simple language representing numerical expressions:

data Expression = Number Int
                | Add Expression Expression
                | Minus Expression Expression
                | Mult Expression Expression
                | Divide Expression Expression

An element of such a data type would have a form such as Mult (Add (Number 4) (Minus (Number 0) (Number 1))) (Number 2).

Writing an evaluation function for this language is a simple exercise; however, more complex transformations also become feasible. For example, an optimization pass in a compiler might be written as a function taking an abstract expression as input and returning an optimized form.

== Pattern matching ==
Algebraic data types are used to represent values that can be one of several types of things. Each type of thing is associated with an identifier called a constructor, which can be considered a tag for that kind of data. Each constructor can carry with it a different type of data.

For example, considering the binary Tree example shown above, a constructor could carry no data (e.g., Empty), or one piece of data (e.g., Leaf has one Int value), or multiple pieces of data (e.g., Node has one Int value and two Tree values).

To do something with a value of this Tree algebraic data type, it is deconstructed using a process called pattern matching. This involves matching the data with a series of patterns. The example function depth above pattern-matches its argument with three patterns. When the function is called, it finds the first pattern that matches its argument, performs any variable bindings that are found in the pattern, and evaluates the expression corresponding to the pattern.

Each pattern above has a form that resembles the structure of some possible value of this datatype. The first pattern simply matches values of the constructor Empty. The second pattern matches values of the constructor Leaf. Patterns are recursive, so then the data that is associated with that constructor is matched with the pattern "n". In this case, a lowercase identifier represents a pattern that matches any value, which then is bound to a variable of that name — in this case, a variable "n" is bound to the integer value stored in the data type — to be used in the expression to evaluate.

The recursion in patterns in this example are trivial, but a possible more complex recursive pattern would be something like:

Node i (Node j (Leaf 4) x) (Node k y (Node Empty z))

Recursive patterns several layers deep are used for example in balancing red–black trees, which involve cases that require looking at colors several layers deep.

The example above is operationally equivalent to the following pseudocode:

switch on (data.constructor)
  case Empty:
    return 0
  case Leaf:
    let n = data.field1
    return 1
  case Node:
    let l = data.field2
    let r = data.field3
    return 1 + max (depth l) (depth r)

The advantages of algebraic data types can be highlighted by comparison of the above pseudocode with a pattern matching equivalent.

Firstly, there is type safety. In the pseudocode example above, programmer diligence is required to not access field2 when the constructor is a Leaf. The type system would have difficulties assigning a static type in a safe way for traditional record data structures. However, in pattern matching such problems are not faced. The type of each extracted value is based on the types declared by the relevant constructor. The number of values that can be extracted is known based on the constructor.

Secondly, in pattern matching, the compiler performs exhaustiveness checking to ensure all cases are handled. If one of the cases of the depth function above were missing, the compiler would issue a warning. Exhaustiveness checking may seem easy for simple patterns, but with many complex recursive patterns, the task soon becomes difficult for the average human (or compiler, if it must check arbitrary nested if-else constructs). Similarly, there may be patterns which never match (i.e., are already covered by prior patterns). The compiler can also check and issue warnings for these, as they may indicate an error in reasoning.

Algebraic data type pattern matching should not be confused with regular expression string pattern matching. The purpose of both is similar (to extract parts from a piece of data matching certain constraints) however, the implementation is very different. Pattern matching on algebraic data types matches on the structural properties of an object rather than on the character sequence of strings.

== Theory ==
A general algebraic data type is a possibly recursive sum type of product types. Each constructor tags a product type to separate it from others, or if there is only one constructor, the data type is a product type. Further, the parameter types of a constructor are the factors of the product type. A parameterless constructor corresponds to the empty product. If a datatype is recursive, the entire sum of products is wrapped in a recursive type, and each constructor also rolls the datatype into the recursive type.

For example, the Haskell datatype:

data List a = Nil | Cons a (List a)

is represented in type theory as $\lambda \alpha. \mu \beta. 1 + \alpha \times \beta$ with constructors $\mathrm{nil}_\alpha = \mathrm{roll}\ (\mathrm{inl}\ \langle\rangle)$ and $\mathrm{cons}_\alpha\ x\ l = \mathrm{roll}\ (\mathrm{inr}\ \langle x, l\rangle)$.

The Haskell List datatype can also be represented in type theory in a slightly different form, thus: $\mu \phi. \lambda \alpha. 1 + \alpha \times \phi\ \alpha$. (Note how the $\mu$ and $\lambda$ constructs are reversed relative to the original.) The original formation specified a type function whose body was a recursive type. The revised version specifies a recursive function on types. (The type variable $\phi$ is used to suggest a function rather than a base type like $\beta$, since $\phi$ is like a Greek f.) The function must also now be applied $\phi$ to its argument type $\alpha$ in the body of the type.

For the purposes of the List example, these two formulations are not significantly different; but the second form allows expressing so-called nested data types, i.e., those where the recursive type differs parametrically from the original. (For more information on nested data types, see the works of Richard Bird, Lambert Meertens, and Ross Paterson.)

In set theory the equivalent of a sum type is a disjoint union, a set whose elements are pairs consisting of a tag (equivalent to a constructor) and an object of a type corresponding to the tag (equivalent to the constructor arguments).

== Programming languages with algebraic data types ==
Many programming languages incorporate algebraic data types as a first class notion, including:

- ATS
- Ceylon
- Clean
- C++
- Elm
- Dart
- Flow
- F#
- F*
- Free Pascal
- Haskell
- Haxe
- Hope
- Idris
- Java (16 for product types, 17 for sum types)
- Kotlin
- Limbo
- Language Of Temporal Ordering Specification (LOTOS)
- Mercury
- Miranda
- Nemerle
- Nim
- OCaml
- Opa
- OpenCog
- Perl
- PureScript
- Python
- Racket
- Reason
- ReScript
- Rocq
- Rust
- Scala
- Standard ML
- Swift
- Tom
- TypeScript
- Visual Prolog

== See also ==
- Disjoint union
- Generalized algebraic data type
- Initial algebra
- Quotient type
- Tagged union
- Type theory
- Visitor pattern
