= ML (programming language) =

General purpose functional programming language

- Paradigm: Multi-paradigm: functional, generic, imperative, interactive
- Designed by: Robin Milner, others at the University of Edinburgh
- First appeared: 1973; 53 years ago
- Typing discipline: Inferred, static, strong

Dialects
- Dependent ML, Lazy ML, ATS

Influenced by
- ISWIM, POP-2, PAL, GEDANKEN

Influenced
- Caml, Clojure, Cyclone, C++, Elm, Erlang, F#, F*, Haskell, Idris, Kotlin, Miranda, Nemerle, OCaml, Opa, Rocq, Rust, Scala, Standard ML

ML (Meta Language) is the metalanguage developed for the Edinburgh LCF theorem prover in the 1970s. It is an early statically typed, functional language with polymorphic type inference in the Hindley–Milner style, and other features like exceptions and mutable variables. ML's design in LCF directly inspired the later ML family (notably Standard ML, Caml, and their derivatives) and influenced subsequent functional language development.

== History ==
ML started development by Robin Milner upon his arrival at University of Edinburgh in 1973 with the help of research assistants Lockwood Morris and Malcolm Newey, both postdocs from Stanford who were hired by Milner. Michael Gordon, Christopher Wadsworth, and other graduate students joined in research by 1975. Historically, ML was conceived to develop proof tactics in the LCF theorem prover and succeed the previous iteration Stanford LCF, trying to solve issues regarding space utilization and proof extensibility. ML acted as both a metalanguage (hence the name) and command (REPL) language for the LCF system. PPLAMBDA, a language that was conceptually a combination of the first-order predicate calculus and the simply typed polymorphic lambda calculus, was the underlying language that theorem statements were more directly constructed in.

As ML was being developed, Milner wrote the paper A theory of type polymorphism in programming in 1978, which laid out the ideas of what it meant for a program to be well-typed in the context of a polymorphic (generic) type system. He used ML as the case-study application of the theorems developed and noted the theoretical challenges that arose with development that had yet to have been solved. The design of the first version of ML was finalized, and subsequently documented in the 1979 book Edinburgh LCF by Milner along with Gordon and Wadsworth.

After Edinburgh LCF was established with the publication of the same name, interest in the language grew and several implementations, all with slight alterations in design and features, were underway by several parties. Luca Cardelli created Cardelli ML, or VAX ML, which eventually grew into a standalone dialect fit for general-purpose computing, specified with the paper ML under Unix. Gérard Huet at Inria began porting the source code from Stanford Lisp to various other dialects of Lisp in "Project Formel". The port to Franz Lisp was further developed by Larry Paulson, whose version eventually was coined Cambridge LCF. This version of the LCF was subsequently updated to use an early version of Standard ML, and has been uploaded to GitHub.

The growing interest and projects being formed in functional language development after the release of Edinburgh LCF—such as Hope, a contemporaneous functional language also developed at Edinburgh—led to a meeting with the title "ML, LCF, and Hope" in November 1982. Concerns with the splintering of both design and implementation leading to duplicated work was raised in this meeting. Although Milner seemed open to the spirit of experimentation in the meeting, further discussions and meetings were had between Bernard Sufrin and Milner, where Sufrin urged Milner to unify the design of ML. These correspondences were later referenced in the second draft of Milner's proposal for Standard ML.

== Overview ==
The most notable inspiration of the syntax of ML can be traced to ISWIM, a language that was described as "lambda calculus with syntactic sugar". ML was designed with a strong static type system that allowed the user to define abstract types with parametric polymorphism and was checked at compile-time. It also had automatic type inference, which afforded ML the ease-of-use of dynamic languages of the time such as Lisp or POP-2 by foregoing the need for explicit type annotations.

== Examples ==
The following examples are very closely derived from Edinburgh LCF, showing a rough overview of the syntax and features of ML. The # character at the start of a line denotes user input, and lines without it are system responses showing the value and its inferred type. Note that this section is not meant to act as a comprehensive set of language features that ML contains, rather a subset to give a sense for the language. Refer to Edinburgh LCF for a more rigorous definition.

Expressions are evaluated by typing them followed by ;; and a return character. The identifier it holds the result of the last-evaluated expression. Bindings are introduced with let, and multiple bindings can be made simultaneously by joining them with the and keyword, or by constructing pairs (which has a product type, explored in a later example) on the right hand side, which is pattern-matched to the left:

#2+3;;
5 : int

#let x = it;;
x = 5 : int

#let y = 2*5 and z = 7;;
y = 10 : int
z = 7 : int

#let x,y,z = y,x,2;;
x = 10 : int
y = 5 : int
z = 2 : int

Functions are defined with let. Function application is higher precedent than mathematical operators, so f 3 + 4 means (f 3) + 4. Functions defined with multiple parameters are curried, so passing one parameter into the function will return a function that will accept the second, and so on. Recursive functions require letrec so the function name is in scope within its body. The syntax for an anonymous function is similar to lambda calculus, with \ for lambda and . separating arguments from the expression:

#let add x y = x+y;;
add = - : (int -> (int -> int))

#add 3;;
- : (int -> int)

#it 4;;
7 : int

#letrec fact n = if n = 0 then 1 else n * fact(n-1);;
fact = - : (int -> int)

#fact 4;;
24 : int

#(\x.x+1) 3;;
4 : int

Lists use semicolons between elements. hd and tl are built-in functions that return the head and tail; . is cons (prepend); @ is append. Functions like hd are polymorphic—ML uses generic type variables (*, **, etc.) to express this:

#let m = [1;2;3;4];;
m = [1; 2; 3; 4] : (int list)

#hd m, tl m;;
1, [2; 3; 4] : (int # (int list))

#0.m @ [5;6];;
[0; 1; 2; 3; 4; 5; 6] : (int list)

#hd;;
- : ((* list) -> *)

#map (\x.x*x) [1;2;3;4];;
[1; 4; 9; 16] : (int list)

Mutable variables are declared with letref and updated with :=. The loop keyword belongs to the if-then-loop construct, which iterates every time the if conditional fails:

#let fact n =
#    letref count = n and result = 1
#    in     if count = 0
#           then result
#           loop count,result := count-1, count*result;;
fact = - : (int -> int)

#fact 4;;
24 : int

Tokens are ML's string type, delimited by `; double backticks create token lists. A common use for tokens was identifying failures with failwith, a keyword used to raise exceptions with an explicit token, and ? is used to trap it:

#`this is a token`;;
`this is a token` : tok

#``this is a token list``;;
[`this`; `is`; `a`; `token`; `list`] : (tok list)

#let half n =
#    if n = 0 then failwith `zero`
#             else let m = n/2
#                  in if n = 2*m then m else failwith `odd`;;
half = - : (int -> int)

#half 4;;
2 : int

#half 3;;
EVALUATION FAILED odd

#half 3 ? 0;;
0 : int

Abstract types are declared with abstype, which creates a new type and defines the functions that work with it, while keeping the internal structure (the concrete type it's built from) hidden. Abstract recursive types are declared with absrectype, which allows the type to be used in its own definition. There is a similar keyword lettype, which is used for more basic type aliasing. Here is a recursive abstract type that defines a binary tree with some basic operations:

#absrectype (*, **) tree = * + ** # (*, **) tree # (*, **) tree
#    with tiptree x = abstree(inl x)
#    and comptree (y, t1, t2) = abstree(inr(y, t1, t2))
#    and istip t = isl(reptree t)
#    and tipof t = outl(reptree t) ? failwith `tipof`
#    and labelof t = fst(outr(reptree t)) ? failwith `labelof`
#    and sonsof t = snd(outr(reptree t)) ? failwith `sonsof`;;
tiptree = - : (* -> (*, **) tree)
comptree = - : ((** # (*, **) tree # (*, **) tree) -> (*, **) tree)
istip = - : ((*, **) tree -> bool)
tipof = - : ((*, **) tree -> *)
labelof = - : ((*, **) tree -> **)
sonsof = - : ((*, **) tree -> ((*, **) tree # (*, **) tree))

Inside the operation definitions (the with block), the type's name can be prepended with abs to box values in the type and rep to unbox values. The characters + and # in type definitions signify sum types (tagged unions) and product types (tuples), respectively, with # having a higher precedence.

ML on LCF provided several helper functions used in the example above. Operating on sum types +, the functions inl and inr inject values into the left or right side of a sum type. outl extracts from left injections (fails if given a right injection), and outr extracts from right injections (fails if given a left injection). For product types #, the extraction functions are fst and snd, which extract the first and second components of a pair. Product types are constructed using the comma infix operator. In the tree example above, comptree takes a single parameter that is a pair pattern (y, t1, t2), which destructures the pair into its three components.

== See also ==
- HOL (proof assistant)
- Hope (programming language)
- Isabelle (proof assistant)
- Nuprl
