= Caml Lights =

Caml Lights may refer to:

- Camel Lights, a brand of cigarette. See Camel (cigarette).
- Caml Light, a functional programming language.
