= Christine Paulin-Mohring =

Mathematical logician and computer scientist

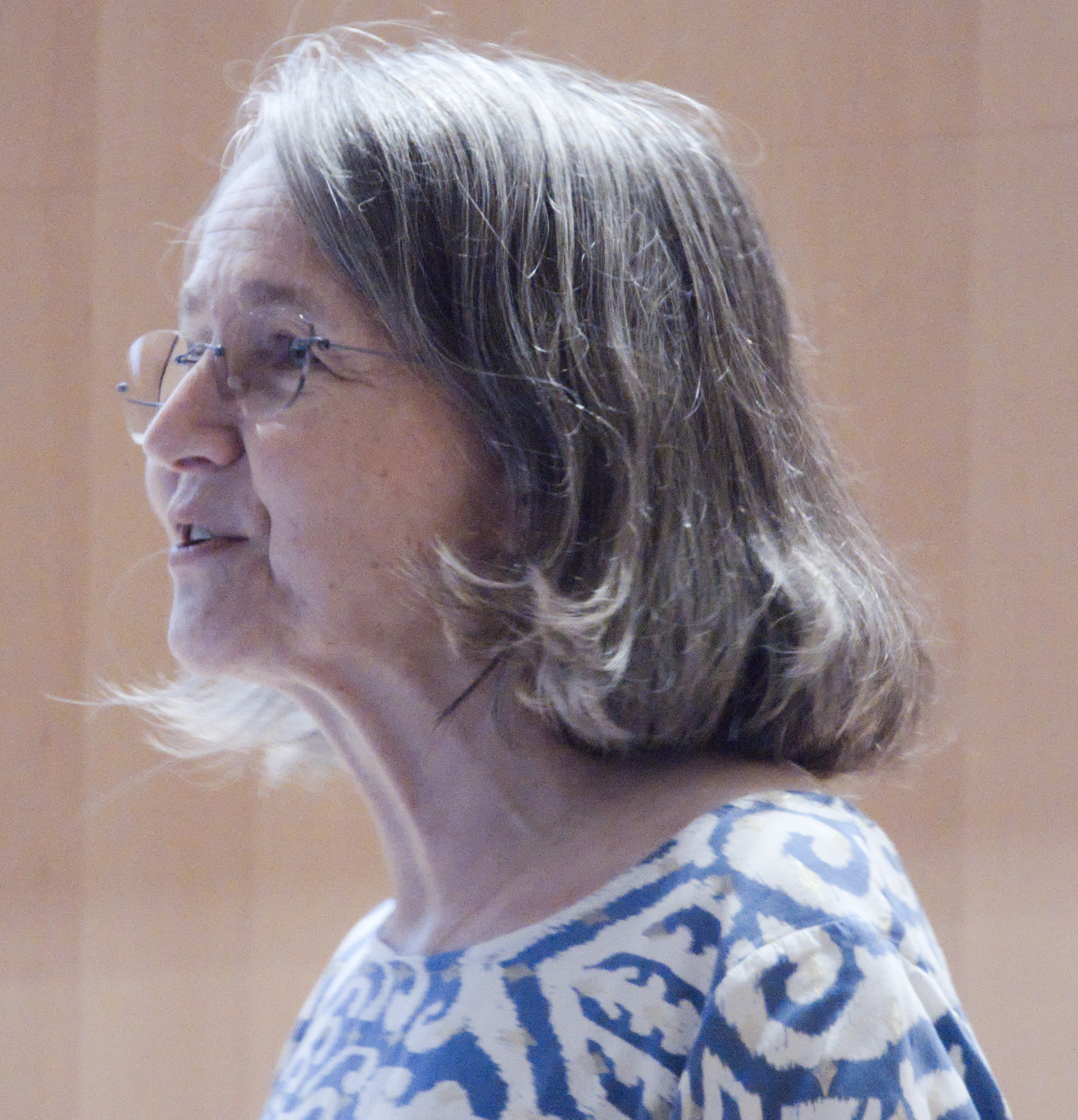
- Paulin-Mohring in 2026
- Born: 1962 (age 63–64)
- Education: Paris Diderot University
- Known for: Rocq
- Awards: ACM Software System Award (2013)
- Scientific career
- Fields: Mathematics, computer science
- Workplaces: Paris-Saclay University
- Doctoral advisor: Gérard Huet

Christine Paulin-Mohring (born 1962) is a mathematical logician and computer scientist, and Professor at the Faculté des Sciences of Paris-Saclay University, best known for developing the interactive theorem prover Rocq.

== Biography ==
Paulin-Mohring received her PhD in 1989, under the supervision of Gérard Huet. She has been a professor at Paris-Saclay University since 1997, and she was the dean of the Paris-Saclay Faculty of Sciences from 2016 until 2021.

Between 2012 and 2015, she was the Scientific Coordinator of the Labex DigiCosme. She is a member of the editorial board of the Journal of Formalized Reasoning.

== Recognition ==
Paulin-Mohring won the Michel-Monpetit Prize of the French Academy of Sciences in 2015.

She and the rest of the development team of the system Rocq (formerly known as Coq)(Thierry Coquand, Gérard Huet, Bruno Barras, Jean-Christophe Filliâtre, Hugo Herbelin, Chetan Murthy, Yves Bertot and Pierre Castéran) won the 2013 ACM Software System Award awarded by the Association for Computing Machinery.

She was elected to the Academia Europaea in 2014.
