= Nemerle =

Programming language

- Paradigm: Multi-paradigm: aspect-oriented, event-driven, functional, generic, imperative, meta, object-oriented, reflective
- Family: C#
- Designed by: Kamil Skalski, Michał Moskal, Prof. Leszek Pacholski, Paweł Olszta at Wrocław University
- Developer: JetBrains (formerly); RSDN
- First appeared: 2003; 23 years ago
- Stable release: 1.2.507.0 / 6 August 2016; 10 years ago
- Typing discipline: Inferred, nominal, static, strong
- Platform: CLI
- Filename extensions: .n
- Website: nemerle.org

Major implementations
- Nemerle

Influenced by
- C#, Lisp, ML

Nemerle is a general-purpose, high-level, statically typed programming language designed for platforms using the Common Language Infrastructure (.NET/Mono). It supports multiple paradigms, including functional, object-oriented, aspect-oriented, reflective, and imperative programming. The language features a simple C#-like syntax and a powerful metaprogramming system. In June 2012, the core Nemerle developers were hired by the Czech software company JetBrains. The team focused on developing Nitra, a framework for implementing existing and new programming languages. Both Nemerle and Nitra appear to have since been abandoned or discontinued by JetBrains; Nitra has not received updates from its original creators since 2017, and Nemerle is now maintained independently by the Russian Software Development Network. However, no major releases have occurred, and development progress remains slow. JetBrains has not referenced Nemerle or Nitra for several years. The language is named after the Archmage Nemmerle, a character in the fantasy novel A Wizard of Earthsea by Ursula K. Le Guin.

== Features ==
Nemerle's most notable feature is the ability to mix styles of programming that are object-oriented and functional. Programs may be structured using object-oriented concepts such as classes and namespaces, while methods can (optionally) be written in a functional style. Other notable features include:

- strong type inference
- a flexible metaprogramming subsystem (using macros)
- full support for object-oriented programming (OOP), in the style of C#, Java, and C++
- full support for functional programming, in the style of ML, OCaml, and Haskell, with these features:
  - higher-order functions
  - pattern matching
  - algebraic types
  - local functions
  - tuples and anonymous types
  - partial application of functions

The metaprogramming system allows for great compiler extensibility, embedding domain-specific languages, partial evaluation, and aspect-oriented programming, taking a high-level approach to lift as much of the burden as possible from programmers. The language combines all Common Language Infrastructure (CLI) standard features, including parametric polymorphism, lambdas, extension methods etc. Accessing the libraries included in the .NET or Mono platforms is as easy as in C#.

=== Type inference ===
def x = 1;           // int
def myList = List(); // generic List[T], type T is deduced from the usage in the next line
myList.Add(x);       // compiler deduces type of T as int making myList type of List[int]

=== Everything is an expression ===
def x =
  { // similar to x = 3
    def y = 1;
    def z = 2;
    y + z   // this last statement is a block return value
  };

def x =
  if (DateTime.Now.DayOfWeek == DayOfWeek.Monday)  // if, using, try are also expressions
    "Monday"
  else
    "other day";

def x = try int.Parse(someString)
        catch { | FormatException() => 0 };

def x = returnBlock : 
  {
    foreach (i in [1, 2, 3])
      when (i > 2)
        returnBlock(true); // exit block (x = true)

    false // x = false
  };

=== Tuples ===
def k = (1, "one"); // k : (int * string)
def (a, b) = k; // a = 1, b = "one"

=== Pattern matching ===
def result = match (number)
{
  | 0            => "zero"
  | 1            => "one"
  | x when x < 0 => "negative"
  | _            => "more than one"
}

Other pattern matching examples

Type matching with variable binding:

def check (o : object) {
  match (o) 
  {
    | i is int    => $"An int: $i"
    | s is string => $"A string: $(s.ToUpper())"
    | _           => "Object of another type"
  }
}

Tuple pattern matching:

match (tuple) 
{
  | ( 42, _ ) => "42 on first position"
  | ( _, 42 ) => "42 on second position"
  | ( x, y )  => $"( $x, $y )"
}

Regexp matching:

using Nemerle.Text;
regexp match (str) {
  | "a+.*"                          => printf("a\n");
  | @"(?<num : int>\d+)-\w+"        => printf("%d\n", num + 3);
  | "(?<name>(Ala|Kasia))? ma kota" =>
     match (name) 
     {
       | Some (n) => printf("%s\n", n)
       | None     => printf("noname?\n")
     }

  | _                               => printf("default\n");
}

=== Functional types and local functions ===
using System.Console; // classes and modules (static classes) can be put in namespaces
def next(x) { x + 1 }; // the type of x argument and other function arguments can be deduced from usage

def mult(x, y) { x * y };

def fibonacci(i)
{
  | 0     => 0
  | 1     => 1
  | other => fibonacci(i - 1) + fibonacci(i - 2)
};

WriteLine(next(9));        // 10  similar to "Console.WriteLine(next(9));" 
WriteLine(mult(2, 2));     // 4
WriteLine(fibonacci(10)); // 55

=== Variants ===
Variants (called data types or sum types in SML and OCaml) are forms of expressing data of several different kinds:

 variant RgbColor {
   | Red
   | Yellow
   | Green
   | Different {
       red : float;
       green : float;
       blue : float;
     }
 }

=== Metaprogramming ===
Nemerle's macro system allows for creating, analysing, and modifying program code during compiling. Macros can be used in the form of a method call or as a new language construct. Many constructs within the language are implemented using macros (if, for, foreach, while, using etc.).

"if" macro example:

macro @if (cond, e1, e2)
syntax ("if", "(", cond, ")", e1, Optional (";"), "else", e2)
{
  /*
    <[ ]> defines an area of quasi-quotation, the Nemerle compiler transforms the code in it 
    to an AST, such transformations are somewhat similar to an Expression compiling in C#
  */
  <[
    match ($cond : bool)
    {
      | true => $e1
      | _ => $e2
    }
  ]>
}

// using this macro in code:
def max = if (a > b) a else b;
// during a compile time the upper line will be transformed to this:
def max = match (a > b)
{
  | true => a
  | _    => b
}

=== Braceless syntax ===
Similarly to the braceless syntax later added to Scala, Nemerle allows the programmer to optionally use a whitespace-sensitive syntax based on the off-side rule, similarly to Python.

The following curly-brace snippet:

using System.Console;

[Qux]
class FooBar {
  public static Main(): void {
    WriteLine("Hello")
  }

  static Foo (x: int): void {
    if (x == 3) {
      def y = x * 42;
      Foo (x)
    } else {
      [x].Map (fun (x) {
        x * 2
      })
    }
  }

  static Bar(): int {
    def foo = 2 + 7 * 13;
    foo
  }
}

could be rewritten as:

using System.Console;

[Qux] \
class FooBar
  public static Main(): void
    WriteLine("Hello")

  static Foo (x: int): void
    if (x == 3) 
      def y = x * 42;
      Foo (x)
    else
      [x].Map (fun (x) {
        x * 2
      })

  static Bar(): int
    def foo = 2 + 7 * 13
    foo

Notably, it is not possible to break expressions or alternative clauses in matches over multiple lines without using a backslash \:

// This will not compile ...

static Bar(): int
  def foo = 2 
     + 7 
     * 13
  foo

match (s)
  | "a"
  | "aa" => 1
  | "b"
  | "bb" => 2
  | _ => 0
 
// But this will:

static Bar(): int
  def foo = 2 \ 
     + 7 \
     * 13
  foo

match (s)
  | "a" \
  | "aa" => 1
  | "b" \
  | "bb" => 2
  | _ => 0

In order to activate this syntax, the user must add #pragma indent to the top of the file or use the compiler option -i.

== IDE ==
Nemerle can be integrated into the integrated development environment (IDE) Visual Studio 2008. It also has a fully free IDE based on Visual Studio 2008 Shell (like Microsoft Visual Studio Express) and SharpDevelop (link to plugin source code).

Nemerle can be also integrated into Visual Studio (up until 2017) using add-ins and extensions.

== Examples ==
=== Hello, World! ===
The traditional Hello, World! can be implemented in a more C#-like fashion:

class Hello
{
  static Main () : void
  {
    System.Console.WriteLine ("Hello, World!");
  }
}

or more simply:

System.Console.WriteLine("Hello, World!");

=== Examples of macros ===
Macros allow generating boilerplate code with added static checks performed by the compiler. They reduce the amount of code that must be written by hand, make code generation safer, and allow programs to generate code with compiler checks, while keeping source code relatively small and readable.

==== String formatting ====
The string formatting macro simplifies variables to string manipulations using $ notation:

def s = $"The number is $i"; //insert the value of the variable i where $i is placed 
def s = $"$x + $y = $(x+y)"; // $(...) can be used to make calculations or access members

==== Declarative code generation ====
StructuralEquality, Memoize, json, and with are macros which generate code in compile time. Though some of them (StructuralEquality, Memoize) can look like C# attributes, during compiling, they will be examined by the compiler and transformed to appropriate code using logic predefined by their macros.

[StructuralEquality] // Implement IEquatable[Sample] .Net interface using by element comparison equality.
class Sample
{
   [Memoize]  // remember first evaluation result 
   public static SomeLongEvaluations() : int  
   {
       MathLib.CalculateNthPrime(10000000)
   }

   [DependencyProperty] // WPF dependency property
   public DependencyPropertySample { get; set; }
   
   public static Main() : void
   {
/* syntax macro "json" generates code: 
JObject.Object([("a", JValue.Number(SomeLongEvaluations())), ("b", JValue.Number(SomeLongEvaluations() + 1))])
*/
       def jObject = json { a: SomeLongEvaluations(); b: (SomeLongEvaluations() + 1)} 
// object initialization macro "<-" is development of C# curly brackets object initialization
       def k = Diagnostics.Process() <- 
       {
          StartInfo <- // can init inner objects properties without ctor call
          {
              FileName = "calc.exe";
              UseShellExecute = true;
          }   
          Exited += () => WriteLine("Calc done"); // events and delegates
       }

       ReadLine();
   }
}

==== Database accessibility ====
Using Nemerle macros for SQL you can write:

ExecuteReaderLoop("SELECT firstname, lastname FROM employee WHERE firstname = $myparm", dbcon,
  {
    WriteLine ($"Name: $firstname $lastname")
  });

instead of

string sql = "SELECT firstname, lastname FROM employee WHERE firstname = :a";
using (NpgsqlCommand dbcmd = new NpgsqlCommand (sql, dbcon, dbtran))
{
  dbcmd.Parameters.Add("a", myparm);

  using (NpgsqlReader reader = dbcmd.ExecuteReader())
  {
     while(reader.Read()) 
     {
        var firstname = reader.GetString (0);
        var lastname = reader.GetString (1);
        Console.WriteLine ("Name: {0} {1}", firstname, lastname)
     }
  }
}

and this is not just hiding some operations in a library, but additional work performed by the compiler to understand the query string, the variables used there, and the columns returned from the database. The ExecuteReaderLoop macro will generate code roughly equivalent to what you would have to type manually. Moreover, it connects to the database at compilation time to check that your SQL query really makes sense.

==== New language constructs ====
With Nemerle macros you can also introduce some new syntax into the language:

macro ReverseFor (i, begin, body)
syntax("ford", "(", i, ";", begin, ")", body)
{
   <[ for ($i = $begin; $i >= 0; $i--) $body ]>
}

defines a macro introducing the ford (EXPR ; EXPR) EXPR syntax and can be used like

ford (i ; n) print (i);

=== Nemerle with ASP.NET ===
Nemerle can be either embedded directly into ASP.NET:

<%@ Page Language="Nemerle" %>
<script runat="server">

    Page_Load(_ : object, _ : EventArgs) : void {
        Message.Text = $"You last accessed this page at: $(DateTime.Now)";
    }

    EnterBtn_Click(_ : object, _ : EventArgs) : void {
        Message.Text = $"Hi $(Name.Text), welcome to ASP.NET!";
    }

</script>

<html>
    <body>
        <form runat="server">
            Please enter your name: <asp:TextBox ID="Name" runat="server" />
            <asp:Button OnClick="EnterBtn_Click" Text="Enter" runat="server" />

            <p><asp:Label ID="Message" runat="server" /></p>
        </form>
    </body>
</html>

...Or stored in a separate file and entered with a single line:

<%@ Page Language="Nemerle" Src="test.n" Inherits="Test" %>

=== PInvoke ===
Nemerle can take advantage of native platform libraries. The syntax is very similar to C#'s and other .NET languages. Here is the simplest example:

using System;
using System.Runtime.InteropServices;

class PlatformInvokeTest
{
    [DllImport("msvcrt.dll")]
    public extern static puts(c : string) : int;

    [DllImport("msvcrt.dll")]
    internal extern static _flushall() : int;

    public static Main() : void
    {
        _ = puts("Test");
        _ = _flushall();
    }
}
