= Logic of Computable Functions =

Deductive system for computable functions by Dana Scott

Logic of Computable Functions (LCF) is a deductive system for computable functions proposed by Dana Scott in 1969 in a memorandum unpublished until 1993. It inspired:

- Logic for Computable Functions (LCF), theorem proving logic by Robin Milner.
- Programming Computable Functions (PCF), small theoretical programming language by Gordon Plotkin.
