= Setoid =

Mathematical construction of a set with an equivalence relation

In mathematics, a setoid (X, ~) is a set (or type) X equipped with an equivalence relation ~. A setoid may also be called E-set, Bishop set, or extensional set.

Setoids are studied especially in proof theory and in type-theoretic foundations of mathematics. Often in mathematics, when one defines an equivalence relation on a set, one immediately forms the quotient set (turning equivalence into equality). In contrast, setoids may be used when a difference between identity and equivalence must be maintained, often with an interpretation of intensional equality (the equality on the original set) and extensional equality (the equivalence relation, or the equality on the quotient set).

== Proof theory ==
In proof theory, particularly the proof theory of constructive mathematics based on the Curry–Howard correspondence, one often identifies a mathematical proposition with its set of proofs (if any). A given proposition may have many proofs, of course; according to the principle of proof irrelevance, normally only the truth of the proposition matters, not which proof was used. However, the Curry–Howard correspondence can turn proofs into algorithms, and differences between algorithms are often important. So proof theorists may prefer to identify a proposition with a setoid of proofs, considering proofs equivalent if they can be converted into one another through beta conversion or the like.

== Type theory ==
In type-theoretic foundations of mathematics, setoids may be used in a type theory that lacks quotient types to model general mathematical sets. For example, in Per Martin-Löf's intuitionistic type theory, there is no type of real numbers, only a type of regular Cauchy sequences of rational numbers. To do real analysis in Martin-Löf's framework, therefore, one must work with a setoid of real numbers, the type of regular Cauchy sequences equipped with the usual notion of equivalence. Predicates and functions of real numbers need to be defined for regular Cauchy sequences and proven to be compatible with the equivalence relation. Typically (although it depends on the type theory used), the axiom of choice will hold for functions between types (intensional functions), but not for functions between setoids (extensional functions). The term "set" is variously used either as a synonym of "type" or as a synonym of "setoid".

== Constructive mathematics ==
In constructive mathematics, one often takes a setoid with an apartness relation instead of an equivalence relation, called a constructive setoid. One sometimes also considers a partial setoid using a partial equivalence relation or partial apartness (see e.g. Barthe et al., section 1).

== See also ==
- Groupoid
