= PAL (programming language) =

Pedagogic Algorithmic Language (PAL)
- Paradigms: functional, imperative
- Designed by: Original: Peter Landin, James H. Morris, Jr. Redesign: Martin Richards, Thomas J. Barkalow, Arthur Evans, Jr., Robert M. Graham, James Morris, John Wozencraft
- Developer: Massachusetts Institute of Technology
- First appeared: 1967; 58 years ago
- Final release: RPAL 0.2.0-rc1 / 4 October 2006; 18 years ago
- Typing discipline: dynamic
- Scope: lexical
- Implementation language: Original: Lisp; Redesign: BCPL
- Platform: IBM 7090, 7094; System/360
- OS: Compatible Time-Sharing System, BOS/360, TOS/360, DOS/360, OS/360
- Website: rpal.sourceforge.net

Dialects
- Right-reference Pedagogic Algorithmic Language (RPAL)

Influenced by
- ISWIM

PAL, the Pedagogic Algorithmic Language, is a programming language developed at the Massachusetts Institute of Technology in around 1967 to help teach programming language semantics and design. It is a "direct descendant" of ISWIM and owes much of its philosophy to Christopher Strachey.

The initial implementation of PAL, in Lisp, was written by Peter Landin and James H. Morris, Jr. and ran on the Compatible Time-Sharing System (CTSS). It was later redesigned by Martin Richards, Thomas J. Barkalow, Arthur Evans, Jr., Robert M. Graham, James Morris, and John Wozencraft. It was implemented by Richards and Barkalow in BCPL as an intermediate-code interpreter and ran on the IBM System/360; this was called PAL/360.

== RPAL ==
The Right-reference Pedagogic Algorithmic Language (RPAL), is a functional programming subset of PAL with an implementation on SourceForge. It is used at the University of Florida to teach the construction of programming languages and functional programming. Programs are strictly functional, with no sequence or assignment operations.
