= François Fages =

French computer scientist

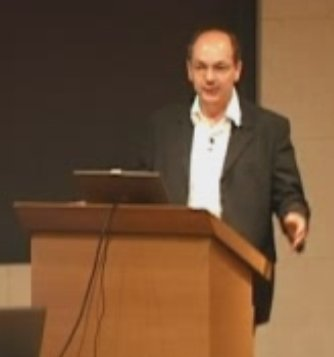
- Fages in May 2008
- Born: 23 August 1959 (age 67); Paris
- Citizenship: French
- Known for: Fages Theorem
- Spouse: Colette Fages (m. 1984) 3 children
- Awards: Monpetit Prize
- Scientific career
- Fields: Computer Science
- Workplaces: INRIA
- Doctoral advisor: Gérard Huet
- Doctoral students: 29

François Fages (August 23, 1959) is a French computer scientist known for contributions in the areas of unification theory, rule-based modelling, logic programming, concurrent constraint logic programming, computational biology and systems biology.

== Early life and education ==
Fages was born in Paris, France. He studied Mathematics and Physics at Université Paris-Sud, Computer Science at the Université Pierre et Marie Curie and received his PhD from the Université Pierre et Marie Curie under the supervision of Gérard Huet, in 1983 at age 23.

== Career ==
Fages took a junior researcher position from CNRS at Ecole Normale Supérieure, and became in addition, part-time teacher at Ecole Polytechnique from 1985 to 1998, and part-time consultant at Thomson-CSF (now Thales Group) research center from 1985 to 1996. Since 1999, he is a senior researcher at the Institut national de recherche en informatique et en automatique (INRIA), the French national research institute on computer science and control.

He is known in unification theory for having shown the non-existence of minimal sets of unifiers in some equational theories (conjecture of Plotkin, 1972), and the decidability of associative-commutative unification in presence of several function symbols (conjecture of Stickel, 1981).

In rule-based modelling, he is known for having created in 1988 a reactive rule-based language at Thomson-CSF (now Thalès group), which was later industrialized by ILOG (now IBM-Ilog) and became ILOG-Rules in 1996.

In logic programming, Fages' theorem states that if a normal logic program is positive-order-consistent—that is, there is no infinite sequence of ground atoms a_{0}, a_{1}, a_{2}, ... related by positive dependencies from a_{i+1} to a_{i} in the atom dependency graph—then the stable models of the program coincide with the two-valued Herbrand models of its Clark's completion. This result has shown useful for implementing stable model semantics with classical propositional satisfiability solvers. This theorem has also been generalized to disjunctive logic programs.

In concurrent constraint logic programming, he has established with Paul Ruet and Sylvain Soliman the logical semantics of concurrent constraint programs in Jean-Yves Girard's linear logic. This result has been generalized to Constraint handling rules and to the asynchronous Pi-calculus.

In 2010 Fages co-ordinated a project to use mathematics to improve the packing of light bulbs and other oddly shaped products.

In 2014 Fages works in computational systems biology, coordinates the development of the Biochemical Abstract Machine (BIOCHAM) rule-based modeling and logical analysis software and studies biochemical processes in the cell cycle and in cell signaling.

In 2014, he received the Monpetit Prize from the French Academy of Sciences.
