= J operator =

In computer science, Peter Landin's J operator is a programming construct that post-composes a lambda expression with the continuation to the current lambda-context. The resulting “function” is first-class and can be passed on to subsequent functions, where if applied it will return its result to the continuation of the function in which it was created.

== History ==
The J operator was created to make labels and jumps a first class value. It was designed to work with the SECD machine with the following extra transitions:

Transition	From	To
J	J:f:S, E, ap:C, D	closure(f,D):S, E, C, D
Closure	closure(f, (S', E', C', D')):x:S, E, ap:C, D	f:x:S', E', ap:C', D'

The J operator originally created what was called a "program closure", consisting of a function called the body and a SECD state called the dump. A program closure is equivalent to composing its body with the dump in continuation form (closure(f,D)(x) = D(f(x)) ).

== Simplified description ==
The J operator composes a function with the continuation of the calling function. That is, the J operator returns a function, which when applied applies the argument of the J operator with the argument of the function, and then forces the function that called the J operator to return that value.

== Examples ==
J(λx.x) is equivalent to a first class return statement. This is because λx.x is the identity function, so when it gets applied it will do nothing to the value given and returns it straight away.

λv.J(λx.x) initially returns the J of λx.x, but that could be used in a surrounding expression to make it re-return a different value.

== See also ==
- Call-with-current-continuation
