= Non-surveyable proof =

Proof that is not easily verified by hand

In the philosophy of mathematics, a non-surveyable proof is a mathematical proof that is considered infeasible or impossible for a human mathematician/s to verify, and so, according to some people, of controversial validity. The term was coined by Thomas Tymoczko in 1979 in criticism of Kenneth Appel and Wolfgang Haken's computer-assisted proof of the four color theorem, and has since been applied to other arguments, mainly those with excessive case splitting or with portions dispatched by a difficult-to-verify computer program. Surveyability remains an important consideration in computational mathematics.

== Tymoczko's argument ==
Tymoczko argued that three criteria determine whether an argument is a mathematical proof:

- Convincingness, which refers to the proof's ability to persuade a rational prover of its conclusion;
- Surveyability, which refers to the proof's accessibility for verification by members of the human mathematical community; and
- Formalizability, which refers to the proof's appealing to only logical relationships between concepts to substantiate its argument.

In Tymoczko's view, the Appel–Haken proof failed the surveyability criterion by, he argued, substituting experiment for deduction:

…if we accept the [four-color theorem] as a theorem, we are committed to changing the sense of "theorem", or, more to the point, to changing the sense of the underlying concept of "proof".
…[the] use of computers in mathematics, as in the [four-color theorem], introduces empirical experiments into mathematics. Whether or not we choose to regard the [four-color theorem] as proved, we must admit that the current proof is no traditional proof, no a priori deduction of a statement from premises. It is a traditional proof with a lacuna, or gap, which is filled by the results of a well-thought-out experiment.

— Thomas Tymoczko, "The Four-Color Problem and its Philosophical Significance"

Without surveyability, a proof may serve its first purpose of convincing a reader of its result and yet fail at its second purpose of enlightening the reader as to why that result is true—it may play the role of an observation rather than of an argument.

This distinction is important because it means that non-surveyable proofs expose mathematics to a much higher potential for error. Especially in the case where non-surveyability is due to the use of a computer program (which may have bugs), most especially when that program is not published, convincingness may suffer as a result. As Tymoczko wrote:

Suppose some supercomputer were set to work on the consistency of Peano arithmetic and it reported a proof of inconsistency, a proof which was so long and complex that no mathematician could understand it beyond the most general terms. Could we have sufficient faith in computers to accept this result, or would we say that the empirical evidence for their reliability is not enough?

— Thomas Tymoczko, "The Four-Color Problem and its Philosophical Significance"

== Counterarguments to Tymoczko's claims of non-surveyability ==
Tymoczko's view is contested, however, by arguments that difficult-to-survey proofs are not necessarily as invalid as impossible-to-survey proofs.

Paul Teller claimed that surveyability was a matter of degree and reader-dependent, not something a proof does or does not have. As proofs are not rejected when students have trouble understanding them, Teller argues, neither should proofs be rejected (though they may be criticized) simply because professional mathematicians find the argument hard to follow. (Teller disagreed with Tymoczko's assessment that "[The four-color theorem] has not been checked by mathematicians, step by step, as all other proofs have been checked. Indeed, it cannot be checked that way.")

An argument along similar lines is that case splitting is an accepted proof method, and the Appel–Haken proof is only an extreme example of case splitting.

== Countermeasures against non-surveyability ==
On the other hand, Tymoczko's point that proofs must be at least possible to survey and that errors in difficult-to-survey proofs are less likely to fall to scrutiny is generally not contested; instead methods have been suggested to improve surveyability, especially of computer-assisted proofs. Among early suggestions was that of parallelization: the verification task could be split across many readers, each of which could survey a portion of the proof. But modern practice, as made famous by Flyspeck, is to render the dubious portions of a proof in a restricted formalism and then verify them with a proof checker that is available itself for survey. Indeed, the Appel–Haken proof has been thus verified.

Nonetheless, automated verification has yet to see widespread adoption.
