= List of programmers =

This is a list of programmers notable for their contributions to software, either as original author or architect, or for later additions. All entries must already have associated articles. Some persons notable as computer scientists are included here because they work in program as well as research.

== A ==
- Michael Abrash – program optimization and x86 assembly language
- Scott Adams – series of text adventures beginning in the late 1970s
- Tarn Adams – Dwarf Fortress
- Leonard Adleman – co-created RSA algorithm (being the A in that name), coined the term computer virus
- Alfred Aho – co-created AWK (being the A in that name), and main author of famous Compilers: Principles, Techniques, and Tools (Dragon book)
- Allan Alcorn – Pong
- Andrei Alexandrescu – author, expert on languages C++, D, and created the Loki library
- Frances Allen – optimizing compilers, program optimization, and parallel computing
- Paul Allen – Altair BASIC, Applesoft BASIC, cofounded Microsoft
- Eric Allman – sendmail, syslog
- Marc Andreessen – co-created Mosaic, cofounded Netscape
- Bruce Artwick – Microsoft Flight Simulator
- Jeremy Ashkenas – CoffeeScript programming language and Backbone.js
- Julian Assange – Surfraw, Rubberhose (file system), Strobe port scanner which influenced Nmap
- Bill Atkinson – QuickDraw, HyperCard
- Lennart Augustsson – languages (Lazy ML, Cayenne), compilers (HBC Haskell, parallel Haskell front end, Bluespec SystemVerilog early), LPMud pioneer, NetBSD device drivers

== B ==
- Roland Carl Backhouse – computer program construction, algorithmic problem solving, ALGOL
- Adam Back – Hashcash
- John Backus – Fortran, BNF
- Lars Bak – virtual machine specialist
- Richard Bartle – MUD, with Roy Trubshaw, created MUDs
- Friedrich L. Bauer – Stack (data structure), Sequential Formula Translation, ALGOL, software engineering, Bauer–Fike theorem
- Kent Beck – created Extreme programming, cocreated JUnit
- Donald Becker – Linux Ethernet drivers, Beowulf clustering
- Brian Behlendorf – Apache HTTP Server, co-founder of The Apache Software Foundation
- Doug Bell – Dungeon Master series of video games
- Fabrice Bellard – created FFmpeg open codec library, QEMU virtualization tools
- Tim Berners-Lee – invented World Wide Web
- Daniel J. Bernstein – djbdns, qmail
- Pierre Bézier – Bézier curve, Bézier surface, Computer-aided manufacturing, UNISURF
- Eric Bina – cocreated Mosaic web browser
- Marc Blank – cocreated Zork
- Jim Blinn – Blinn–Phong reflection model
- Joshua Bloch – core Java language designer, lead the Java collections framework project
- Jonathan Blow – video games: Braid, The Witness
- Susan G. Bond – cocreated ALGOL 68-R
- Grady Booch – cocreated Unified Modeling Language
- Ed Boon – Mortal Kombat
- Alan H. Borning – human–computer interaction, object-oriented programming, constraint programming, programming languages, ThingLab
- Bert Bos – authored Argo web browser, co-authored Cascading Style Sheets
- Keith Bostic – nvi, FreeBSD, NetBSD, and OpenBSD
- Stephen R. Bourne – cocreated ALGOL 68C, created Bourne shell
- David Bradley – coder on the IBM PC project team who wrote the Control-Alt-Delete keyboard handler, embedded in all PC-compatible BIOSes
- Andrew Braybrook – video games Paradroid and Uridium
- Larry Breed – implementation of Iverson Notation (APL), co-developed APL\360, Scientific Time Sharing Corporation cofounder
- Jack Elton Bresenham – created Bresenham's line algorithm
- Dan Bricklin – cocreated VisiCalc, the first personal spreadsheet program
- Walter Bright – Digital Mars, First C++ compiler, authored D (programming language)
- Sergey Brin – cofounded Google Inc.
- Per Brinch Hansen (surname "Brinch Hansen") – RC 4000 multiprogramming system, operating system kernels, microkernels, monitors, concurrent programming, Concurrent Pascal, distributed computing & processes, parallel computing
- Richard Brodie – Microsoft Word
- Andries Brouwer – Hack, former maintainer of man pager, Linux kernel hacker
- Paul Buchheit – created Gmail
- Danielle Bunten Berry (Dani Bunten) – M.U.L.E., multiplayer video game and other noted video games
- Rod Burstall – languages COWSEL (renamed POP-1), POP-2, NPL, Hope; ACM SIGPLAN 2009 PL Achievement Award
- Vitalik Buterin – Ethereum
- Dries Buytaert – created Drupal

== C ==
- Steve Capps – cocreated Macintosh and Newton
- John Carmack – first-person shooters Doom, Quake
- Edwin Catmull – co-founder of Pixar, Catmull–Rom spline, Catmull–Clark subdivision surface, texture mapping
- Vint Cerf – TCP/IP, NCP
- Timothy M. Chan – Chan's algorithm
- Donald D. Chamberlin – SQL
- David Chaum – blind signatures, International Association for Cryptologic Research, mix-net, electronic voting, Dining cryptographers protocol, privacy-enhancing technologies, and the godfather of digital currency
- Steve Chen – co-founder of YouTube, AVOS, and part of the PayPal Mafia
- Ward Christensen – wrote the first BBS (Bulletin Board System) system CBBS
- Edgar F. Codd – principal architect of relational model
- Bram Cohen – BitTorrent protocol design and implementation
- Alain Colmerauer – Prolog
- Richard W. Conway – compilers for CORC, CUPL, and PL/C; XCELL Factory Modelling System
- Alan Cooper – Visual Basic
- Fernando J. Corbató – Multics and Compatible Time-Sharing System
- Mike Cowlishaw – REXX and NetRexx, LEXX editor, image processing, decimal arithmetic packages
- Alan Cox – co-developed Linux kernel
- Brad Cox – Objective-C
- Mark Crispin – created IMAP, authored UW-IMAP, one of reference implementations of IMAP4
- William Crowther – Colossal Cave Adventure
- Ward Cunningham – created Wiki concept
- Dave Cutler – architected RSX-11M, OpenVMS, VAXELN, DEC MICA, Windows NT
- Doug Cutting – Apache Hadoop, Apache Lucene, Apache Nutch

== D ==
- Ole-Johan Dahl – cocreated Simula, object-oriented programming
- Ryan Dahl – created Node.js
- Wei Dai – Crypto++ library, b-money, VMAC
- Terry A. Davis – developer of TempleOS
- Jeff Dean – Spanner, Bigtable, MapReduce, TensorFlow
- L. Peter Deutsch – Ghostscript, Assembler for PDP-1, XDS-940 timesharing system, QED original co-author
- Robert Dewar – IFIP WG 2.1 member, chairperson, ALGOL 68; AdaCore cofounder, president, CEO
- Edsger W. Dijkstra – contributions to ALGOL, Dijkstra's algorithm, Go To Statement Considered Harmful, IFIP WG 2.1 member
- Matt Dillon – programmed various software including DICE and DragonflyBSD
- Jack Dorsey – created Twitter
- Martin Dougiamas – creator and lead developed Moodle
- Adam Dunkels – authored Contiki operating system, the lwIP and uIP embedded TCP/IP stacks, invented protothreads
- Pavel Durov — co-founding of VK and Telegram

== E ==
- Les Earnest – authored finger program
- Alan Edelman – Edelman's Law, stochastic operator, Interactive Supercomputing, Julia (programming language) cocreator, high performance computing, numerical computing
- Brendan Eich – created JavaScript
- Larry Ellison – co-created Oracle Database, cofounded Oracle Corporation
- Andrey Ershov – languages ALPHA, Rapira; first Soviet time-sharing system AIST-0, electronic publishing system RUBIN, multiprocessing workstation MRAMOR, IFIP WG 2.1 member, Aesthetics and the Human Factor in Programming
- Marc Ewing – created Red Hat Linux

== F ==
- Scott Fahlman – created smiley face emoticon :-)
- Dan Farmer – created COPS and Security Administrator Tool for Analyzing Networks (SATAN) Security Scanners
- Steve Fawkner – created Warlords and Puzzle Quest
- Craig Federighi – NeXTSTEP and Apple senior vice president
- Stuart Feldman – created make, authored Fortran 77 compiler, part of original group that created Unix
- David Filo – cocreated Yahoo!
- Hal Finney — helped Satoshi Nakamoto debug Bitcoin, reusable proof-of-work, and early developer of Pretty Good Privacy.
- Brad Fitzpatrick – created memcached, Livejournal and OpenID
- Andrew Fluegelman – author PC-Talk communications software; considered a cocreated shareware
- Scott Forstall – lead software developer during the creation of iOS for iPad and iPhone
- Martin Fowler – created the dependency injection pattern of software engineering, a form of inversion of control
- Brian Fox – created Bash, Readline, GNU Finger
- Nick Frosst – co-founder of the Toronto-based AI company Cohere

== G ==
- Elon Gasper – cofounded Bright Star Technology, patented realistic facial movements for in-game speech; HyperAnimator, Alphabet Blocks, etc.
- Bill Gates – Altair BASIC, cofounded Microsoft
- Jim Gettys – X Window System, HTTP/1.1, One Laptop per Child, Bufferbloat
- Steve Gibson – created SpinRite
- John Gilmore – GNU Debugger (GDB)
- Adele Goldberg – cocreated Smalltalk
- Ian Goldberg – Off-the-record messaging
- Ryan C. Gordon (a.k.a. Icculus) – Lokigames, ioquake3
- James Gosling – Java, Gosling Emacs, NeWS
- Bill Gosper – Macsyma, Lisp machine, hashlife, helped Donald Knuth on Vol.2 of The Art of Computer Programming (Semi-numerical algorithms)
- Paul Graham – Yahoo! Store, On Lisp, ANSI Common Lisp
- John Graham-Cumming – authored POPFile, a Bayesian filter-based e-mail classifier
- Richard Greenblatt – Lisp machine, Incompatible Timesharing System, MacHack
- Brendan Gregg – eBPF, DTrace toolkit
- David Gries – The book The Science of Programming, Interference freedom, Member Emeritus, IFIP Working Group 2.3 on Programming Methodology
- Ralph Griswold – cocreated SNOBOL, created Icon (programming language)
- Robert Griesemer – cocreated Go
- Neil J. Gunther – authored Pretty Damn Quick (PDQ) performance modeling program
- Scott Guthrie (a.k.a. ScottGu) – ASP.NET creator
- Jürg Gutknecht – with Niklaus Wirth: Lilith computer; Modula-2, Oberon, Zonnon programming languages; Oberon operating system
- Andi Gutmans – cocreated PHP programming language
- Michael Guy – Phoenix, work on number theory, computer algebra, higher dimension polyhedra theory, ALGOL 68C; work with John Horton Conway

== H ==
- Daniel Ha – cofounder and CEO of blog comment platform Disqus
- Nico Habermann – work on operating systems, software engineering, inter-process communication, process synchronization, deadlock avoidance, software verification, programming languages: ALGOL 60, BLISS, Pascal, Ada
- Jim Hall – started the FreeDOS project
- Margaret Hamilton – Director of Software Engineering Division of MIT Instrumentation Laboratory, which developed on-board flight software for the space Apollo program
- Brian Harris – machine translation research, Canada's first computer-assisted translation course, natural translation theory, community interpreting (Critical Link)
- Donald Haderle – one of the first commercial RDBMSs the IBM Db2
- Juris Hartmanis – Computational complexity theory
- Eric Hehner – predicative programming, formal methods, quote notation, ALGOL
- David Heinemeier Hansson – created the Ruby on Rails framework for developing web applications
- Rebecca Heineman – authored Bard's Tale III: Thief of Fate and Dragon Wars
- Gernot Heiser – operating system teaching, research, commercialising, Open Kernel Labs, OKL4, Wombat
- Anders Hejlsberg – Turbo Pascal, Delphi, C#, TypeScript
- Ted Henter – founded Henter-Joyce (now part of Freedom Scientific) created JAWS screen reader software for blind people
- Andy Hertzfeld – co-created Macintosh, cofounded General Magic, cofounded Eazel
- Joe Hewitt — Firebug and DOM Inspector
- D. Richard Hipp – created SQLite
- C. A. R. Hoare – first implementation of quicksort, ALGOL 60 compiler, Communicating sequential processes
- Louis Hodes – Lisp, pattern recognition, logic programming, cancer research
- John Henry Holland – pioneer in what became known as genetic algorithms, developed Holland's schema theorem, Learning Classifier Systems
- Adrian Holovaty — Django (web framework)
- Allen Holub – author and public speaker, Agile Manifesto signatory
- Bri Holt – founder of Vidmeter and Engrade
- Grace Hopper – Harvard Mark I computer, FLOW-MATIC, COBOL
- Ben Horowitz – Netscape product manager and Opsware co-founder and CEO
- Paul Hudak – Haskell language design, textbooks on it and computer music
- Tom Hudson – 3D Studio, CAD-3D, DEGAS
- David A. Huffman – created the Huffman coding; a compression algorithm
- Roger Hui – co-authored J
- Dave Hyatt – co-authored Mozilla Firefox
- P. J. Hyett – cofounded GitHub

== I ==
- Miguel de Icaza – GNOME project leader, initiated Mono project
- Jean Ichbiah – Ada (programming language)
- Roberto Ierusalimschy – Lua leading architect
- Dan Ingalls – cocreated Smalltalk and Bitblt
- Ross Ihaka – R (programming language)
- Geir Ivarsøy – cocreated Opera web browser
- Ken Iverson – APL, J
- Toru Iwatani – created Pac-Man

== J ==
- Bo Jangeborg – ZX Spectrum games
- Paul Jardetzky – authored server program for the first webcam
- Rod Johnson – created Spring Framework, founded SpringSource
- Stephen C. Johnson – yacc
- Lynne Jolitz – 386BSD
- William Jolitz – 386BSD
- Bill Joy – BSD, csh, vi, cofounded Sun Microsystems
- Robert K. Jung – created ARJ

== K ==
- Ted Kaehler – contributions to Smalltalk, Squeak, HyperCard
- Laxmikant Kale – Charm++
- Poul-Henning Kamp – MD5 password hash algorithm, FreeBSD GEOM and GBDE, part of UFS2, FreeBSD Jails, malloc and the Beerware license
- Mitch Kapor – Lotus 1-2-3, founded Lotus Development Corporation
- Jawed Karim – co-founded YouTube and part of the PayPal Mafia
- Andrej Karpathy - co-founded OpenAI, director of artificial intelligence at Tesla, coined the term "vibe coding"
- Michael Kass – Active contour model
- Phil Katz – created Zip (file format), authored PKZIP
- Alan Kay – Smalltalk, Dynabook, Object-oriented programming, Squeak
- Mel Kaye – LGP-30 and RPC-4000 machine code programmer at Royal McBee in the 1950s, famed as "Real Programmer" in the Story of Mel
- Stan Kelly-Bootle – Manchester Mark 1, The Devil's DP Dictionary
- John Kemeny – cocreated BASIC
- Brian Kernighan – cocreated AWK (being the K in that name), AMPL, and authored ditroff text-formatting tool
- Gary Kildall – CP/M, MP/M, BIOS, PL/M, also known for work on data-flow analysis, binary recompilers, multitasking operating systems, graphical user interfaces, disk caching, CD-ROM file system and data structures, early multi-media technologies, founded Digital Research (DRI)
- Spencer Kimball – GIMP, CockroachDB
- Tom Knight – Incompatible Timesharing System
- Jim Knopf – a.k.a. Jim Button, author PC-File flatfile database; cocreated shareware
- Donald E. Knuth – TeX, CWEB, Metafont, The Art of Computer Programming, Concrete Mathematics
- Andrew R. Koenig – co-authored books on C and C++ and former Project Editor of ISO/ANSI standards committee for C++
- Gennady Korotkevich - Competitive programmer, first to break the 3900 barrier on Codeforces
- Cornelis H. A. Koster – Report on the Algorithmic Language ALGOL 68, ALGOL 68 transput

== L ==
- Andre LaMothe – created XGameStation, one of world's first video game console development kits
- Leslie Lamport – LaTeX
- Butler Lampson – QED original co-author
- Peter Landin – ISWIM, J operator, SECD machine, off-side rule, syntactic sugar, ALGOL, IFIP WG 2.1 member
- Tom Lane – main author of libjpeg, major developer of PostgreSQL
- Sam Lantinga – created Simple DirectMedia Layer (SDL)
- Dick Lathwell – codeveloped APL\360
- Tim Berners-Lee – inventor of the World Wide Web
- Chris Lattner – main author of LLVM project, Swift, Mojo (programming language), Clang, MLIR
- Samuel J. Leffler – BSD, FlexFAX, LibTIFF, FreeBSD Wireless Device Drivers
- Rasmus Lerdorf – original creator of PHP
- Xavier Leroy — OCaml and CompCert
- Michael Lesk – Lex
- Gordon Letwin – architected OS/2, authored High Performance File System (HPFS)
- Max Levchin – co-founder of PayPal
- Jochen Liedtke – microkernel operating systems Eumel, L3, L4
- Charles H. Lindsey – IFIP WG 2.1 member, Revised Report on ALGOL 68
- Håkon Wium Lie – co-authored Cascading Style Sheets
- Barbara Liskov – CLU (programming language), Argus (programming language), Liskov substitution principle
- Mike Little - co-authored WordPress
- Yanhong Annie Liu – programming languages, algorithms, program design, program optimization, software systems, optimizing, analysis, and transformations, intelligent systems, distributed computing, computer security, IFIP WG 2.1 member
- Ed Logg – Asteroids, Tetris, and other Atari video games
- Robert Love – Linux kernel developer
- Ada Lovelace – first programmer (of Charles Babbages' Analytical Engine)
- Al Lowe – created Leisure Suit Larry series
- David Luckham – Lisp, Automated theorem proving, Stanford Pascal Verifier, Complex event processing, Rational Software cofounder (Ada compiler)
- Hans Peter Luhn – hash-coding, linked list, searching and sorting binary tree

== M ==
- Magnus Manske – MediaWiki and GENtle
- Khaled Mardam-Bey – created mIRC (Internet Relay Chat Client)
- Simon Marlow – Haskell developer, book author; co-developer: Glasgow Haskell Compiler, Haxl remote data access library
- Robert C. Martin – authored Clean Code, The Clean Coder, leader of Clean Code movement, signatory on the Agile Manifesto
- John Mashey – authored PWB shell, also called Mashey shell
- Yukihiro Matsumoto "Matz" – Ruby language
- Peter Mattis – GTK, GIMP
- Timothy C. May – Cypherpunks electronic mailing list, time-lock puzzle, Crypto Anarchist Manifesto
- Conor McBride – researches type theory, functional programming; cocreated Epigram (programming language) with James McKinna; member IFIP Working Group 2.1 on Algorithmic Languages and Calculi
- John McCarthy – Lisp, ALGOL, IFIP WG 2.1 member, artificial intelligence
- Craig McClanahan – original author Jakarta Struts, architect of Tomcat Catalina servlet container
- Daniel D. McCracken – professor at City College and authored Guide to Algol Programming, Guide to Cobol Programming, Guide to Fortran Programming (1957)
- Scott A. McGregor – architect and development team lead of Microsoft Windows 1.0, co-authored X Window System version 11, and developed Cedar Viewers Windows System at Xerox PARC
- Douglas McIlroy – macros, pipes and filters, concept of software componentry, Unix tools (spell, diff, sort, join, graph, speak, tr, etc.)
- Marshall Kirk McKusick – Berkeley Software Distribution (BSD), work on FFS, implemented soft updates
- Sid Meier – author, Civilization and Railroad Tycoon, cofounded MicroProse
- Ralph Merkle – Co-inventor of public key cryptography, Merkle tree, Merkle's puzzles, Merkle–Hellman knapsack cryptosystem, Merkle–Damgård construction
- Bertrand Meyer – Eiffel, Object-oriented Software Construction, design by contract
- Jude Milhon – founding member of the Cypherpunks
- Bob Miner – co-created Oracle Database, cofounded Oracle Corporation
- Jeff Minter – psychedelic, and often llama-related video games
- James G. Mitchell – WATFOR compiler, Mesa (programming language), Spring (operating system), ARM architecture
- Arvind Mithal – formal verification of large digital systems, developing dynamic dataflow architectures, parallel computing programming languages (Id, pH), compiling on parallel machines
- Petr Mitrichev – competitive programmer
- Cleve Moler – co-authored LINPACK, EISPACK, and MATLAB
- Lou Montulli – created Lynx browser, cookies, the blink tag, server push and client pull, HTTP proxying, HTTP over SSL, browser integration with animated GIFs, founding member of HTML working group at W3C
- Bram Moolenaar – authored text-editor Vim
- David A. Moon – Maclisp, ZetaLisp
- Charles H. Moore – created Forth language
- Roger Moore – co-developed APL\360, created IPSANET, cofounded I. P. Sharp Associates
- Matt Mullenweg – co-authored WordPress
- Boyd Munro – Australian developed GRASP, owns SDI, one of earliest software development companies
- Elon Musk – Zip2, X.com, OpenAI, and Grok
- Mike Muuss – authored ping, network tool to detect hosts

== N ==
- Satoshi Nakamoto – Bitcoin and blockchain database
- Peter Naur (1928–2016) – Backus–Naur form (BNF), ALGOL 60, IFIP WG 2.1 member
- Fredrik Neij – cocreated The Pirate Bay
- Graham Nelson – created Inform authoring system for interactive fiction
- Greg Nelson (1953–2015) – satisfiability modulo theories, extended static checking, program verification, Modula-3 committee, Simplify theorem prover in ESC/Java
- Klára Dán von Neumann (1911–1963) – principal programmer for the MANIAC I
- Maurice Nivat (1937–2017) – theoretical computer science, Theoretical Computer Science journal, ALGOL, IFIP WG 2.1 member
- Peter Norton – programmed Norton Utilities
- Peter Norvig – books Artificial Intelligence: A Modern Approach, Paradigms of AI Programming: Case Studies in Common Lisp
- Kristen Nygaard (1926–2002) – Simula, object-oriented programming

== O ==
- Ed Oates – cocreated Oracle Database, cofounded Oracle Corporation
- Martin Odersky – Scala
- Peter O'Hearn – separation logic, bunched logic, Infer Static Analyzer
- Jarkko Oikarinen – created Internet Relay Chat (IRC)
- Travis Oliphant — NumPy, SciPy, Anaconda (Python distribution), Probabilistic programming
- Andrew and Philip Oliver, the Oliver Twins – many ZX Spectrum games including Dizzy
- John Ousterhout – created Tcl/Tk

== P ==
- Keith Packard – X Window System
- Larry Page – cofounded Google, Inc.
- Alexey Pajitnov – created game Tetris on Electronika 60
- Seymour Papert – Logo (programming language)
- Tony Parisi – Virtual Reality Modeling Language (VRML)
- David Park (1935–1990) – first Lisp implementation, expert in fairness, program schemas, bisimulation in concurrent computing
- Mike Paterson – algorithms, analysis of algorithms (complexity)
- Tim Paterson – authored 86-DOS (QDOS)
- Bruce Perens – co-found of the Open Source Initiative and original author of BusyBox
- Alan Perlis – first successful compiler and co-developed ALGOL
- Markus Persson – created Minecraft
- Tim Peters – Timsort, CPython
- Jeffrey Peterson – key free and open-source software architect, created Quepasa
- Charles Petzold – authored many Microsoft Windows programming books
- Simon Peyton Jones – functional programming, Glasgow Haskell Compiler, C--
- Rob Pike – wrote first bitmapped window system for Unix, cocreated UTF-8 character encoding, authored text editor sam and programming environment acme, main author of Plan 9 and Inferno operating systems, co-authored Go (programming language)
- Kent Pitman – technical contributor to the ANSI Common Lisp standard
- Robin Popplestone – COWSEL (renamed POP-1), POP-2, POP-11 languages, Poplog IDE; Freddy II robot
- Tom Preston-Werner – cofounded GitHub

== R ==
- Theo de Raadt – founding member of NetBSD, founded OpenBSD and OpenSSH
- Brian Randell – ALGOL 60, software fault tolerance, dependability, pre-1950 history of computing hardware
- T. V. Raman – specializes in accessibility research (Emacspeak, ChromeVox (screen reader for Google Chrome)
- Jef Raskin – started the Macintosh project in Apple Computer, designed Canon Cat computer, developed Archy (The Humane Environment) program
- Eric S. Raymond – Open Source movement, authored fetchmail
- Hans Reiser – created ReiserFS file system
- John Resig – creator and lead developed jQuery JavaScript library
- Craig Reynolds – created boids computer graphics simulation
- John C. Reynolds – continuations, definitional interpreters, defunctionalization, Forsythe, Gedanken language, intersection types, polymorphic lambda calculus, relational parametricity, separation logic, ALGOL
- Reinder van de Riet – Editor: Europe of Data and Knowledge Engineering, COLOR-X event modeling language
- Dennis Ritchie – C, Unix, Plan 9 from Bell Labs, Inferno
- Ron Rivest – cocreated RSA algorithm (being the R in that name). created RC4 and MD5
- John Romero – first-person shooters Doom, Quake
- Armin Ronacher — Flask (web framework)
- Ton Roosendaal – Blender
- Blake Ross – co-authored Mozilla Firefox
- Douglas T. Ross – Automatically Programmed Tools (APT), Computer-aided design, structured analysis and design technique, ALGOL X
- Guido van Rossum – Python
- Andy Rubin – Android (operating system)
- Philip Rubin – articulatory synthesis (ASY), sinewave synthesis (SWS), and HADES signal processing system.
- Jeff Rulifson – lead programmer on the NLS project
- Rusty Russell – created iptables for linux
- Steve Russell – first Lisp interpreter; original Spacewar! graphic video game
- Mark Russinovich – Sysinternals.com, Filemon, Regmon, Process Explorer, TCPView and RootkitRevealer

== S ==
- Bob Sabiston – Rotoshop, interpolating rotoscope animation software
- Muni Sakya – Nepalese software
- Jean E. Sammet – FORMAC, COBOL
- Grant Sanderson – Manim a Python mathematical library for mathematical visualizations for his 3Blue1Brown YouTube channel
- Chris Sawyer – developed RollerCoaster Tycoon and the Transport Tycoon series
- David Sayre – one of the developers for Fortran and Coherent diffraction imaging
- Cher Scarlett – Apple, Webflow, Blizzard Entertainment, World Wide Technology, and USA Today
- Bob Scheifler – X Window System, Jini
- Isai Scheinberg – IBM engineer, founded PokerStars
- Bill Schelter – GNU Maxima, GNU Common Lisp
- John Scholes – Direct functions
- Randal L. Schwartz – Just another Perl hacker
- Adi Shamir – cocreated RSA algorithm (being the S in that name)
- Mike Shaver – founding member of Mozilla Organization
- Cliff Shaw – Information Processing Language (IPL), the first AI language
- Zed Shaw – wrote the Mongrel Web Server, for Ruby web applications
- Eric Schmidt – Lex and CEO of Google
- Emily Short – prolific writer of Interactive fiction and co-developed Inform version 7
- Jacek Sieka – developed DC++ an open-source, peer-to-peer file-sharing client
- Daniel Siewiorek – electronic design automation, reliability computing, context aware mobile computing, wearable computing, computer-aided design, rapid prototyping, fault tolerance
- Ken Silverman – created Duke Nukem 3D's graphics engine
- Charles Simonyi – Hungarian notation, Bravo (the first WYSIWYG text editor), Microsoft Word
- Colin Simpson – developed CircuitLogix simulation software
- Rich Skrenta – cofounded DMOZ
- David Canfield Smith – invented interface icons, programming by demonstration, developed graphical user interface, Xerox Star; Xerox PARC researcher, cofounded Dest Systems, Cognition
- Matthew Smith – ZX Spectrum games, including Manic Miner and Jet Set Willy
- Edward Snowden – American NSA contractor and whistleblower, co-developer of the Haven security app.
- Henry Spencer – C News, Regex
- Joel Spolsky – cofounded Fog Creek Software and Stack Overflow
- Quentin Stafford-Fraser – authored original VNC viewer, first Windows VNC server, client program for the first webcam
- Richard Stallman – Emacs, GNU Compiler Collection (GCC), GDB, founder and pioneer of GNU Project, terminal-independent I/O pioneer on Incompatible Timesharing System (ITS), Lisp machine manual
- Guy L. Steele Jr. – Common Lisp, Scheme, Java, Emacs
- Alexander Stepanov – created Standard Template Library
- Michael Stonebraker – Ingres, Postgres, Vertica, Streambase, Illustra, VoltDB, SciDB
- Christopher Strachey – draughts playing program
- Ludvig Strigeus – created μTorrent, OpenTTD, ScummVM and the technology behind Spotify
- Bjarne Stroustrup – created C++
- Zeev Suraski – cocreated PHP language
- Gerald Jay Sussman – Scheme
- Bert Sutherland – computer graphics, Internet
- Ivan Sutherland – computer graphics: Sketchpad, Evans & Sutherland
- Herb Sutter – chair of ISO C++ standards committee and C++ expert
- Gottfrid Svartholm – cocreated The Pirate Bay
- Aaron Swartz – software developer, writer, Internet activist
- Tim Sweeney – The Unreal engine, UnrealScript, ZZT

== T ==
- Amir Taaki – leading developer of Bitcoin project
- Andrew Tanenbaum – Minix
- Audrey "Autrijus" Tang – designed Pugs compiler–interpreter for Perl 6 (now Raku); Digital Affairs Minister, Taiwan 2022–2024
- Simon Tatham – Netwide Assembler (NASM), PuTTY
- Larry Tesler – the Smalltalk code browser, debugger and object inspector, and (with Tim Mott) the Gypsy word processor
- Jon Stephenson von Tetzchner – cocreated Opera web browser
- Avie Tevanian – authored Mach kernel
- Ken Thompson – mainly designed and authored Unix, Plan 9 and Inferno operating systems, B and Bon languages (precursors of C), created UTF-8 character encoding, introduced regular expressions in QED and co-authored Go language
- Simon Thompson – functional programming research, textbooks; Cardano domain-specific languages: Marlowe
- Michael Tiemann – G++, GNU Compiler Collection (GCC)
- Linus Torvalds – original author and current maintainer of Linux kernel and created Git, a source code management system
- Andrew Tridgell – Samba, Rsync
- Roy Trubshaw – MUD – together with Richard Bartle, created MUDs
- Bob Truel – cofounded DMOZ
- Alan Turing – mathematician, computer scientist and cryptanalyst
- David Turner – SASL, Kent Recursive Calculator, Miranda, IFIP WG 2.1 member

== V ==
- Wietse Venema – Postfix, Security Administrator Tool for Analyzing Networks (SATAN), TCP Wrapper
- Bernard Vauquois – pioneered computer science in France, machine translation (MT) theory and practice including Vauquois triangle, ALGOL 60
- Pat Villani – original author FreeDOS/DOS-C kernel, maintainer of defunct Linux for Windows 9x distribution
- Paul Vixie – BIND, Cron
- Patrick Volkerding – original author and current maintainer of Slackware Linux Distribution

== W ==
- Eiiti Wada – ALGOL N, IFIP WG 2.1 member, Japanese Industrial Standards (JIS) X 0208, 0212, Happy Hacking Keyboard
- John Walker – cofounded Autodesk
- Larry Wall – Warp (1980s space-war game), rn, patch, Perl
- Bob Wallace – author PC-Write word processor; considered shareware cocreator
- Alexandr Wang — Scale AI and Meta's chief AI officer
- Chris Wanstrath – cofounded GitHub, created the Atom (text editor) and the Mustache template system
- John Warnock – created PostScript
- Robert Watson – FreeBSD network stack parallelism, TrustedBSD project and OpenBSM
- Joseph Henry Wegstein – ALGOL 58, ALGOL 60, IFIP WG 2.1 member, data processing technical standards, fingerprint analysis
- Pei-Yuan Wei – authored ViolaWWW, one of earliest graphical browsers
- Peter J. Weinberger – cocreated AWK (being the W in that name)
- Jim Weirich – created Rake, Builder, and RubyGems for Ruby; popular teacher and conference speaker
- Joseph Weizenbaum – created ELIZA
- David Wheeler – cocreated subroutine; designed WAKE; co-designed Tiny Encryption Algorithm, XTEA, Burrows–Wheeler transform
- Molly White – HubSpot; creator of Web3 Is Going Just Great
- Arthur Whitney – A+, K
- why the lucky stiff – created libraries and writing for Ruby, including quirky, popular Why's (poignant) Guide to Ruby to teach programming
- Adriaan van Wijngaarden – Dutch pioneer; ARRA, ALGOL, IFIP WG 2.1 member
- Bruce Wilcox – created Computer Go, programmed NEMESIS Go Master
- Evan Williams – created and cofounded language Logo
- Roberta and Ken Williams – Sierra Entertainment, King's Quest, graphic adventure game
- Simon Willison — Django (web framework)
- Sophie Wilson – designed instruction set for Acorn RISC Machine, authored BBC BASIC
- Zooko Wilcox-O'Hearn – Zcash
- Dave Winer – developed XML-RPC, Frontier scripting language
- Niklaus Wirth – ALGOL W, IFIP WG 2.1 member, Pascal, Modula-2, Oberon
- Stephen Wolfram – created Mathematica, Wolfram Alpha, Wolfram Language
- Don Woods – INTERCAL, Colossal Cave Adventure
- Philip Woodward – ambiguity function, sinc function, comb operator, rep operator, ALGOL 68-R
- Steve Wozniak – Breakout, Apple Integer BASIC, cofounded Apple Inc.
- Will Wright – created the Sim City series, cofounded Maxis
- William Wulf – BLISS system programming language + optimizing compiler, Hydra operating system, Tartan Laboratories

== Y ==
- Jerry Yang – co-created Yahoo!
- Victor Yngve – authored first string processing language, COMIT
- Nobuo Yoneda – Yoneda lemma, Yoneda product, ALGOL, IFIP WG 2.1 member

== Z ==
- Matei Zaharia – created Apache Spark
- Jamie Zawinski – Lucid Emacs, Netscape Navigator, Mozilla, XScreenSaver
- Yang Zhilin — Co-founder of Moonshot AI, Co-author of XLNet and Transformer-XL
- Phil Zimmermann – created encryption software PGP, the ZRTP protocol, and Zfone
- Mark Zuckerberg – created Facebook

== See also ==
- List of artificial intelligence people
- List of computer scientists
- List of computer magazines and List of computer books
- List of computer science journals and List of software programming journals
- List of computing people
- List of members of the National Academy of Sciences (computer and information sciences)
- List of pioneers in computer science
- List of programming language researchers
- List of Russian programmers
- List of Turing Award laureates
- List of video game industry people (programming)
- Notable cypherpunks
