= PC-Write =

Early word processing shareware

- Intro screen of PC-Write version 2.5 localized in Greek. PC-Write was the de facto word processor in many branches of the Greek public sector in the early 1990s.
- Original author: Bob Wallace
- Release: early 1983; 43 years ago
- Operating system: DOS
- Type: Word processor
- License: Shareware

PC-Write is a computer word processor and was one of the first three widely popular software products sold via shareware. It was originally written by Bob Wallace in early 1983.

== Overview ==
PC-Write is a modeless editor for MS-DOS, using control characters and special function keys to perform various editing operations. By default it accepts many of the same control key commands as WordStar while adding many additional features. It can produce plain ASCII text files, but there are also features that embed control characters in a document to support automatic section renumbering, bold and italic fonts, and other capabilities. A feature that is useful in list processing (as used in AutoLISP) is its ability to find matching open and closed parenthesis "( )"; this matching operation also works for other paired characters: { }, [ ] and < >.

Lines beginning with particular control characters, a period (.), or both contain commands that are evaluated when the document is printed, e.g. to specify margin sizes, select elite or pica type, or to specify the number of lines of text that would fit on a page.

PC-Write's implementation of free-form editing can copy and paste a block of text anywhere. For instance, if one has a block of information, one per line, in the format Name (spaces) Address, one can highlight only the addresses section and paste that into the right-hand part of a page.

While Quicksoft distributed copies of PC-Write for $10, the company encouraged users to make copies of the program for others in an early example of shareware. Quicksoft asked those who liked PC-Write to send it $75, in return for which they would provide a printed manual (notable for its many pictures of cats, drawn by Megan Dana-Wallace), telephone technical support, source code, and a registration number for the user to enter into their copy of the program. If another person paid the $75 to register a copy of an already-registered copy, the company would pay a $25 commission back to the original registrant (and issue a new number to the new buyer), providing a financial incentive for users to distribute and promote the software. In later versions, registered copies would include a thesaurus.

A configuration file allows customization, including remapping the keyboard. In addition, there is vocabulary available in other languages, such as in German. Utilities are provided to convert PC-Write files to and from other contemporary file formats.

One limitation of the software is its inability to print directly from memory; because the print function was a separate subprogram, a document must be saved to a file before it can be printed.

PC-Write was reportedly still selling well in 1988, with more than 27,000 registered users paying $1.5 million a year. Bob Wallace found that running Quicksoft used so much of his time he could not improve the PC-Write software. In early 1991, he sold the firm to another Microsoft alumnus, Leo Nikora, the original product manager for Windows 1.0 (1983–1985). Wallace returned to full programming and an updated version of PC-Write was released in June 1991.

As the software market shifted to Microsoft Windows-based software, demand for MS-DOS software all but disappeared. Quicksoft went out of business in 1993.

The first Trojan horse malware (appearing in 1986), PC-Write Trojan, masqueraded as "version 2.72" of the shareware word processor PC-Write. Quicksoft did not release a version 2.72.

PC-Write had one of the first "as you type", in "real-time mode" spell checker; earlier spell checkers only worked in "batch mode".

The Brown Bag Word Processor is based on PC-Write's source code, licensed by Brown Bag Software, with some minor modifications.

== Reception ==
A 1988 PC Magazine reader survey found that 6% used PC-Write, tied for fifth with DisplayWrite 4 among word processors.

PC Magazine in 1984 stated that version 1.3 of PC-Write "rates extremely well and compares favorably with many word processors costing much more". It cited very fast performance, good use of color, and availability of source code as advantages, while lack of built-in support for printing bold or underline and keyboard macros was a disadvantage. In a 1985 review of low-cost word processors the magazine said that PC-Write was powerful but much harder to use than others, criticizing the poor documentation. PC advised readers that for those willing to spend more than $10 "you can do a lot better". In a 1987 article on the same topic the magazine approved of version 2.7 power and speed, stating that its features "compare well against even some of the best professional word processors". While another program with WYSIWYG and context-sensitive help might be better for a novice, PC said, PC-Write "may be the only word processor you'll ever need". The same article said of Brown Bag Word Processor that those who wanted a DOS shell, outliner, and other utilities should choose it over PC-Write, while those who did not should buy the otherwise-identical latter and save $40. PC in 1988 said that version 2.71 was an "excellent personal word processor ... with speed and capabilities well beyond the needs of the average user". While noting its 60K file size limit, and difficulty of remembering its many key combinations, the magazine concluded that "If you can get through the learning curve, you won't be disappointed".

Compute! in 1985 complimented PC-Write's "clean implementation of standard editing features", cited its "truly staggering" level of customization, and after mentioning a few flaws stated that they should be "viewed in context of the program's overall excellence". Edward Mendelson that year recommended PC-Write 2.5 in The Yale Review: Inferior to WordPerfect, Nota Bene, and XyWrite, but "may be had for as little as one-fiftieth of the price, or less". In 1986 he said that version 2.55 "becomes a more amazing bargain all the time", with "dozens of small improvements".

== See also ==
- Andrew Fluegelman
- Jim Knopf, also known as Jim Button
- PC-File
- PC-Talk
