= PC-File =

Software

PC-File was a flat-file database computer application most often run under MS-DOS.

== Software ==
It was one of the first of three widely popular software products sold via the marketing method that became known as shareware. It was originally written by Jim "Button" Knopf in late 1982, and he formed the company Buttonware to develop, market, and support it.

The program was usually distributed for the cost of diskettes by local user groups. There was no copy protection and a manual was distributed as a file on the same diskettes as the program. It was extremely simple to use and extremely stable. It ran on just about any PC, while competing commercial products costing hundreds of dollars were often picky and full of bugs.

Knopf originally wrote the software for his own use to manage a church mailing list, on an Apple II. Later, he ported it to CP/M, and then to MS-DOS. Other people heard about it, and started requesting copies. Eventually, the cost of sending out update disks inspired Knopf to include a note requesting a small cash donation to offset the expenses. The response was overwhelming, and when his income from PC-File exceeded "ten times" what he was making from his job at IBM, he decided to turn Buttonware into a full-time business.

By June 1984 Knopf estimated that he had released 15 versions of PC-File, incorporating many user suggestions. He said that 50,000 copies were being used, and that about $1,000 in $45 checks arrived daily. After PC-File version 3.0, Buttonware released PC-File/R, which had limited "relational" capabilities. In 1987, PC-File+ was rewritten to use the popular dBASE III file format.

PC-File for Microsoft Windows v8 was published by Outlook Software / Ace Software (previously Good Software) in 1994. This version works on Windows 3.1, 95, 98, and XP, but uses the 8.3 file naming convention. PC File will not run on Windows 7 64-bit, even in the XP compatibility mode, but will run in 'XP Mode'.

== Reception ==
In a 1984 review of databases, PC Magazine found that "quite a few ... rough edges" existed, but concluded that "on a performance/price basis, [PC-File III] may be the best money you'll ever spend". In a 1985 review of low-cost databases the magazine named the "extraordinary" PC-File III 3.0 one of two Editor's Choices. PC said that it had "features ... not available on some programs costing ten times as much", and was "the best bargain in the bunch".

== See also ==
- PC-Write
- Bob Wallace
- PC-Talk
- Andrew Fluegelman
