= Pristine Sources =

Software management concept

Pristine Sources is a software management concept coined by the developers of the short-lived Bogus Linux distribution and popularized by Marc Ewing, co-founder of Red Hat Inc, after he adopted it and RPM Package Manager as a development philosophy for Red Hat Linux. It was the concept that enabled Red Hat to build Linux distributions faster and more reliably than had been possible previously. Briefly, the problem with building an operating system out of the myriad pieces of open source (or free software) components available from teams across the Internet was that there were many of these components and they all upgraded on different schedules at different times. Ewing's insight was to recognize that he could not take responsibility for these components. He and Erik Troan, wanted to build a software package management system, RPM, that allowed the team at Red Hat to avoid changing any of the source code of the software components they needed to use to build their Red Hat Linux operating system.

It is best summed up by Ewing's explanation in a mid-1990s Red Hat manual:

"The Philosophy Behind RPM"
