= Jim Button =

Jim Button may refer to:

- Jim Knopf, nicknamed Jim Button, computer programmer
- The main character in Michael Ende's Jim Button novels:
  - Jim Button and Luke the Engine Driver
    - Jim Button and Luke the Engine Driver (film)
  - Jim Button and the Wild 13
