= FILE ID.DIZ =

Text file describing its containing archive

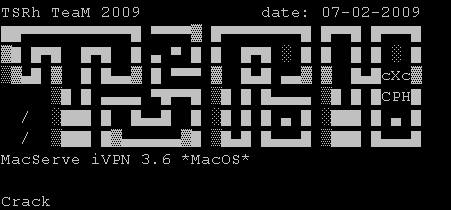

In a bulletin board system (BBS) and later the warez scene, FILE_ID.DIZ is a plain-text file that describes the content of the archive in which it is located. Use of the file allows for a concise description of uploaded files to be automatically applied. FILE_ID stands for "file identification". DIZ stands for "description in zipfile".

== History ==
The FILE_ID.DIZ file convention was invented to address a common problem with BBS file upload. BBS software would prompt the user to input a description for the uploaded file, but these descriptions were often less than useful. In order to provide better service, BBS operators spent significant effort enhancing these descriptions.

Clark Development and the Association of Shareware Professionals (ASP) supported the idea of this becoming a standard for file descriptions. Clark rewrote the PCBDescribe program and included it with their PCBoard BBS software. The ASP urged their members to use this description file format in their distributions. Michael Leavitt, an employee of Clark Development, released the file specification and his PCBDescribe program source code to the public domain and urged other BBS software companies to support the DIZ file.

SysOps could add a common third-party script written in PPL, called "DIZ/2-PCB" that would process, rewrite, verify, and format DIZ files from archives as they were uploaded to a BBS. The software would extract the archive, examine the contents, compile a report, import the DIZ description file and then format it according to your liking. During this time, it was usual practice to add additional lines to the description, such as ads exclaiming the source of the uploaded BBS.

Even since the decline of the dial-up bulletin board system, FILE_ID.DIZ files are still utilized by the warez scene in their releases of unlicensed software. They are commonly bundled as part of the complete packaging by pirate groups, and indicate the number of disks, and other basic information. Along with the NFO file, it is essential to the release.

== Format ==
Although the format of files could and did vary, according to v1.9 of the specification developed for the ASP, a file consists of 7-bit, alphanumeric ASCII text, limited to 10 lines of no more than 45 characters each and contains program name, version, ASP number (if from an ASP member), a description separator and a description. For example:

MY PROGRAM v1.23 <ASP> - A program which will
do anything for anybody. Will run in only 2k
of memory. Can be run from the command line,
or installed as a TSR. Completely menu-
driven. Version 1.23 reduces the previous 4k
memory requirements, and adds an enhanced
graphical user interface. Also, MY PROGRAM 
now contains Windows and DESQview support. 
Coming soon - an OS/2 version.
From Do-It-All Software, Inc. $15.00

Many files adhere to 45-character, plain ASCII text for the first 8 lines, then continued with up to 80-character wide, 8-bit ASCII or ANSI graphic page with better-formatted documentation.

== See also ==
- .nfo – File name extension for a Warez scene release description file
- README – Software information file
- Portable Application Description – Document format for automated software product cataloging
- Standard Architecture for Universal Comment Extensions — For attaching metadata to files
- DESC.SDI — Another metadata file used for BBS
- DESCRIPT.ION — A text file containing metadata about files and directories
