= Recutils =

Toolset for using plain text files as a database

GNU Recutils
- Original author: Jose E. Marchesi
- Initial release: December 3, 2010; 15 years ago
- Stable release: 1.9 / April 16, 2022; 4 years ago
- Written in: C
- License: GNU General Public License
- Website: www.gnu.org/software/recutils/
- Repository: git.savannah.gnu.org/cgit/recutils.git

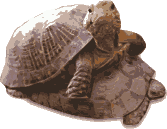
Fred and George, mascots of Recutils

Recutils, from GNU Project, is a free command-line toolset for performing basic relational database operations on plain text files – including field typing, auto-increment, and join. Storage files – known as recfiles – conform to a file format defined by the toolset. As plain text, recfiles can be edited via a text editor (as long it supports the character encoding). Various other software libraries support the format.

A recfile is a text file with empty lines between records. Each field of a record is a line starting with the field name and a colon. Multiple record types can be in a single file. A long line can be wrapped (i.e. for readability).

Fields can be marked as mandatory and also have their value limited to a set of predefined values.

Tools include:

- recsel – Search for and print fields from records matching a query
- recins – Insert a record, or replace existing records
- recdel – Delete a record, or delete a set of records
- recfix – Check, fix, and sort rec files
- recset – Add or update individual fields

== Example ==
The following is formatted as a recfile.

%rec: Text
%type: Year int

Author: Doug McIlroy
Year: 1964
Note: The Origin of Unix Pipes

Title: Unix Text Processing
Author: Dale Dougherty
Author: Tim O'Reilly
Year: 1987
Publisher: Hayden Books

Author: William Shakespeare
Title: Hamlet
Year: 1599
Year: 1600
Year: 1601

The following command selects records where a year field is greater than 1900 and outputs the author field values. The first two records have a year greater than 1900 so are selected. The first record has a single author and the second has two, so the result is three author names.

$ recsel -e 'Year > "1900"' -p Author
Author: Doug McIlroy
Author: Dale Dougherty
Author: Tim O'Reilly

== See also ==
- asciidoc – Human-readable document format
- Flat-file database – Database stored as flat data
- org-mode – Open source mode for GNU Emacs
- TOML – Configuration file format
