= Submission software =

Submission software is a category of computer software that allows its users to publish their products or websites over the Internet. This software is typically used by marketing professionals who work in online marketing. It represents an electronic solution for online marketing as opposed to offline (newspapers, street banners) or media (radio, television) marketing.

Usually these packages allow three types of submissions: automatic, semi-automatic and manual.

== Types of submission software ==
- Software submission - allows to submit software products either through the use of PAD files or by filling the websites submission forms
- Article submission - submits articles to article directories or online magazines
- Website submission - submits website addresses to all kind of directories
- Press release submission - applications that allow users to submit press releases to PR websites
- RSS submission - submits RSS feeds to RSS publishing sites

== See also ==
- Portable Application Description
- Search engine submission
