= Jim Knopf =

IBM employee

Jim Knopf, nicknamed Jim Button ("Knopf" meaning "button" in German) (October 20, 1942 – October 1, 2013), was considered by many to be one of the "fathers" of shareware (so named by fellow software veteran Peter Norton). As an IBM employee, he wrote a program to help with a local church congregation. When demand for his program consumed too much of his time, he quit IBM and created Buttonware. He released his first program, PC-File (a flat file database), in late 1982 as "user supported software".

Knopf used the "Jim Button" pseudonym to avoid PC-File conflicting with his day job. By 1984 he had made hundreds of revisions and released 15 versions of the software, describing himself as "just an implementer of the ideas of users". Knopf collaborated with PC-Talk (communications software) developer Andrew Fluegelman to adopt similar names (PC-File was originally "Easy-File"), and prices, for their initial shareware offerings; they also agreed to mention each other's products in their program's documentation. Fluegelman referred to this distribution method as "freeware".

A few months later (early 1983), Bob Wallace followed suit, coining the term "shareware" for his similarly marketed product, PC-Write, a word processor.

By 1988 ButtonWare also offered a shareware word processor, PC-Type Plus. Knopf had a near-death experience in 1992, when his heart stopped beating briefly while experiencing a heart attack. Shortly thereafter, he sold all his business assets and retired to the Pacific Northwest. He died on October 1, 2013, after suffering for several years from heart disease and Crohn's disease.

== See also ==
- List of programmers
- Shareware
- Free Software
