= Shareware =

Proprietary software with time-limited free use

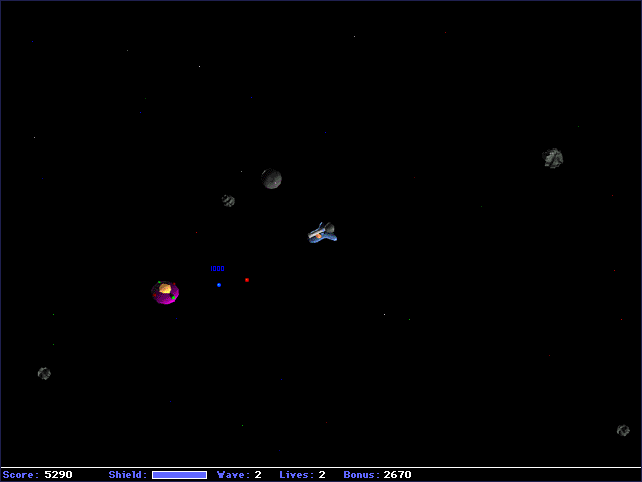
Screenshot of Maelstrom, a 1992 video game released as shareware

Shareware is proprietary software that is initially shared by the owner for trial use at little or no cost. Often the software has limited functionality or incomplete documentation until the user sends payment to the owner. Shareware is often offered as a download from a website. Shareware differs from freeware, which is fully-featured software distributed at no cost to the user but without source code being made available; and free and open-source software, in which the source code is freely available for anyone to inspect and alter.

There are many types of shareware and, while they may not require an initial up-front payment, many are intended to generate revenue in one way or another. Some limit use to personal, non-commercial purposes, with purchase of a license required for business use. The software itself may be time-limited, or it may remind the user that payment would be appreciated.

The term shareware is largely out of use in the modern computing world, replaced by trialware or freemium.

== Types of shareware ==
=== Trialware ===
Trialware or demoware is a program that limits the time that it can be effectively used, commonly via a built-in time limit, number of uses, or only allowing progression up to a certain point (e.g. video game demos). The user can try out the fully-featured program until the trial period is up, and then most trialware reverts to either a reduced-functionality (known as freemium, nagware, or crippleware) or non-functional mode, unless the user purchases the full version. Trialware has become normalized for software as a service (SaaS). WinRAR is a notable example of unlimited trialware, i.e. a program that retains its full functionality even after the trial period has ended.

The rationale behind trialware is to give potential users the opportunity to try out the program to judge its usefulness before purchasing a license. According to industry research firm Softletter, 66% of online companies surveyed had free-trial-to-paying-customer conversion rates of 25% or less. SaaS providers employ a wide range of strategies to convert leads into paying customers.

=== Freemium ===
Freemium works by offering a product or service free of charge (typically digital offerings such as software, content, games, web services or others) while charging a premium for advanced features, functionality, or related products and services. For example, a fully-functional, feature-limited version may be given away for free, with advanced features disabled until a license fee is paid. The word freemium combines the two aspects of the business model: 'free' and 'premium'. It has become a popular model especially in the antivirus industry.

=== Adware ===
Adware, short for advertising-supported software, is any software package which automatically renders advertisements in order to generate revenue for its author. Shareware is often packaged with adware to lower the shareware fees or eliminate the need to charge users a fee. The advertisements may take the form of a banner on an application window. The functions may be designed to analyze which websites the user visits and to present advertising pertinent to the types of goods or services featured there. The term is sometimes used to refer to software that displays unwanted advertisements, which typically are more intrusive and may appear as pop-ups, as is the case in most ad-oriented spyware. During the installation of the intended software, the user is presented with a requirement to agree to the terms of a click-through end-user license agreement or similar licensing, which governs the installation of the software.

=== Crippleware ===
Crippleware has vital program features such as printing or the ability to save files disabled, or unwanted features like watermarks on screencasting and video editing software enabled, until the user buys the software. This allows users to take a close look at the features of a program without being able to use it to generate output. The distinction between freemium and crippleware is that an unlicensed freemium program has useful functionality, while crippleware demonstrates its potential but is not useful on its own.

=== Donationware ===
Donationware is a licensing model that supplies fully-operational and unrestricted software to the user and requests an optional donation be paid to the programmer or a third-party beneficiary (usually a non-profit). The donation amount may be set by the author, or left up to the user, based on individual perceptions of the software's value. Since donationware comes fully operational (i.e. not crippleware) with payment optional, it is a type of freeware. In some cases, there is a delay to start the program or a nag screen reminding the user that they have not donated to the project. This nag feature or delayed start is often removed in an update once the user has donated or paid for the software.

=== Nagware ===
Nagware (also known as begware, annoyware or a nag screen) is a pejorative term for shareware that persistently reminds the user to purchase a license. It usually does this by popping up a message when the user starts the program, or intermittently while the user is using the application. These messages can appear as windows obscuring part of the screen, or as modal window message boxes that can quickly be closed. Some nagware keeps the message up for a certain time period and locks the application, forcing the user to wait to continue to use the program. Unlicensed programs that support printing, photo or video editing may superimpose a watermark on the printed or exported output, typically stating that the output was produced by an unlicensed copy.

Some titles display a dialog box with payment information and a message that paying will remove the notice, which is usually displayed either upon startup or after an interval while the application is running. These notices are designed to annoy the user into paying.

=== Postcardware ===
Postcardware, also called just cardware, is a style of software distribution similar to shareware, distributed by the author on the condition that users send the author a postcard. A variation of cardware, emailware, uses the same approach but requires the user to send the author an email. Postcardware, like other novelty software distribution terms, is often not strictly enforced. Cardware is similar to beerware.

The concept was first used by Aaron Giles, author of JPEGView. Another well-known piece of postcardware is the roguelike game Ancient Domains of Mystery, whose author collects postcards from around the world. Orbitron is distributed as postcardware. Exifer is a popular application among digital photographers that has been postcardware. Caledos Automatic Wallpaper Changer is a "still alive" project cardware. "Empathy" is a postcardware for password-protected executables. Dual Module Player and Linux were also postcardware for a long time. An example of emailware is the video game Jump 'n Bump. Another popular postcardware company is the Laravel package developers from Spatie, which has released over 200 open-source packages to the Laravel framework, which are postcardware licensed, and all shown at their website.

== History ==
In 1982, Andrew Fluegelman created a program for the IBM PC called PC-Talk, a telecommunications program, and used the term freeware; he described it "as an experiment in economics more than altruism". About the same time, Jim "Button" Knopf released PC-File, a database program, calling it user-supported software. Not much later, Bob Wallace produced PC-Write, a word processor, and called it shareware. Appearing in an episode of Horizon titled Psychedelic Science originally broadcast 5 April 1998, Bob Wallace said the idea for shareware came to him "to some extent as a result of my psychedelic experience". Fluegelman said that his experience as a book publisher and author discouraged him from finding a traditional software publisher. KQED pledge drives inspired his distribution method, as well as his not knowing how to implement copy protection.

In 1983, Jerry Pournelle wrote of "an increasingly popular variant" of free software "that has no name, but works thus: 'If you like this, send me (the author) some money. I prefer cash.'" In 1984, Softalk-PC magazine had a column, The Public Library, about such software. Public domain is a misnomer for shareware, and Freeware was trademarked by Fluegelman and could not be used legally by others, and User-Supported Software was too cumbersome. So columnist Nelson Ford had a contest to come up with a better name.

The most popular name submitted was Shareware, which was being used by Wallace. However, Wallace acknowledged that he got the term from an InfoWorld magazine column by that name in the 1970s, and that he considered the name to be generic, so its use became established over freeware and user-supported software.

By 1984, Knopf reported receiving about $1,000 a day for PC-File, and by 1985 Fluegelman was receiving "dozens of $35 checks" daily. He had two employees to fulfill orders and answer questions for PC-Talk. By 1988, more than 27,000 registered PC-Write users were paying $1.5 million a year. Fluegelman, Knopf, and Wallace clearly established shareware as a viable software distribution model by becoming wealthy.

Before the popularity of the World Wide Web and widespread Internet access, shareware was often the only economical way for independent software authors to get their product onto users' desktops. Those with Internet or BBS access could download software and distribute it amongst their friends or user groups, who would then be encouraged to send the registration fee to the author, usually via postal mail. During the late 1980s and early 1990s, shareware software was widely distributed over online services, BBS, and on diskettes. Contrary to commercial developers who spent millions of dollars urging users "Don't Copy That Floppy", shareware developers encouraged users to upload the software and share it on disks.

Commercial shareware distributors, such as Educorp and Public Domain Inc., printed catalogs describing thousands of public domain and shareware programs that were available for a small charge on floppy disk. These companies later made their entire catalog available on CD-ROM. One such distributor, Public Software Library (PSL), began an order-taking service for programmers who otherwise had no means of accepting credit card orders. Meanwhile, major online service provider CompuServe enabled people to pay (register) for software using their CompuServe accounts. When AOL bought out CompuServe, its SWREG (Shareware Registration) division was sold to UK businessman Stephen Lee of Atlantic Coast PLC, who moved the service online and enabled over 3,000 independent software developers to use SWREG as a back office to accept various payment methods including credit, debit and charge cards, PayPal and other services in multiple currencies. This worked in real time so that a client could pay for software and instantly download it, which was novel at the time. SWREG was eventually bought by Digital River. Similarly, services like Kagi started offering applications that authors could distribute along with their products that would present the user with an onscreen form to fill out, print, and mail along with their payment. Once telecommunications became more widespread, this service also expanded online. Toward the beginning of the Internet era, books compiling reviews of available shareware were published, sometimes targeting specific niches such as small business. These books would typically come with one or more floppy disks or CD-ROMs containing software from the book.

As Internet use grew, users turned to downloading shareware programs from FTP or websites. This spelled the end of bulletin board systems and shareware disk distributors. At first, disk space on a server was hard to come by, so networks like Info-Mac were developed, consisting of non-profit mirror sites hosting large shareware libraries accessible via the web or FTP. With the advent of the commercial web hosting industry, the authors of shareware programs started their own sites where the public could learn about their programs and download the latest versions, and even pay for the software online. This erased one of the chief distinctions of shareware, as it was now most often downloaded from a central, official location instead of being shared samizdat-style by its users. To ensure users would get the latest bug fixes as well as avoid files tainted by viruses or other malware, some authors discouraged users from giving the software to their friends, encouraging them to send a link instead.

Major download sites such as VersionTracker and CNet's Download.com began to rank titles based on quality, feedback, and downloads. Popular software was sorted to the top of the list, along with products whose authors paid for preferred placement.

== Registration ==
If features are disabled in the freely accessible version, paying may provide the user with a license key or code they can enter into the software to disable the notices and enable full functionality. Some pirate websites publish license codes for popular shareware, leading to a kind of arms race between the developer and the pirates where the developer disables pirated codes and the pirates attempt to find or generate new ones. Some software publishers have started accepting known pirated codes, using the opportunity to educate users on the economics of the shareware model.

Some shareware relies entirely on the user's honesty and requires no password. Simply checking an "I have paid" checkbox in the application is all that is required to disable the registration notices.

== Games ==
In the early 1990s, shareware distribution was a popular method of publishing games for smaller developers, including then-fledgling companies Apogee Software (also known as 3D Realms), Epic MegaGames (now Epic Games), Ambrosia Software and id Software. It gave consumers the chance to play the game before investing money in it, and it gave them exposure that some products would be unable to get in the retail space.

With the Kroz series, Apogee introduced the episodic shareware model that became the most popular incentive for buying a game. While the shareware game would be complete, there would be additional episodes of the game that were not shareware and could only be legally obtained by paying. In some cases these episodes were neatly integrated and would feel like a longer version of the game, and in other cases the later episodes would be stand-alone games. Sometimes the additional content was completely integrated with the unregistered game, such as in Ambrosia's Escape Velocity series, in which a character representing the developer's pet parrot, equipped with an undefeatable ship, would periodically harass and destroy the player after they reached a certain level representing the end of the trial period.

Racks of games on single 5 1/4-inch and later 3.5-inch floppy disks were common in retail stores. However, computer shows and BBS such as Software Creations BBS were the primary distributors of low-cost software. Free software from a BBS was the motivating force for consumers to purchase a computer equipped with a modem, so as to acquire software at no cost. The success of shareware games, including id Software hits Commander Keen and Doom, depended in part on the BBS community's willingness to redistribute them from one BBS to another across North America. The reasons for redistribution included allowing modem users who could not afford long-distance calls the opportunity to view the games.

The important distinguishing feature between a shareware game and a game demo is that the shareware game is (at least in theory) a complete game, albeit with reduced content compared to the full game, while a game demo omits significant functionality as well as content. Shareware games commonly offered both single player and multiplayer modes plus a significant fraction of the full game content such as the first of three episodes, while some even offered the entire product as shareware while unlocking additional content for registered users. By contrast a game demo may offer as little as one single-player level or consist solely of a multiplayer map, making them easier to prepare than a shareware game.

== Industry standards and technologies ==
Several widely accepted standards and technologies are used in the development and promotion of shareware.

- FILE ID.DIZ is a descriptive text file often included in downloadable shareware distribution packages.
- Portable Application Description (PAD) is used to standardize shareware application descriptions. A PAD file is an XML document that describes a shareware or freeware product according to the PAD specification.
- DynamicPAD extends the PAD standard by allowing shareware vendors to provide customized PAD XML files to each download site or any other PAD-enabled resource. DynamicPAD is a set of server-side PHP scripts distributed under a GPL license and a freeware DynamicPAD builder for 32-bit Windows. The primary way to consume or submit a DynamicPAD file is through the RoboSoft application by Rudenko Software, the DynamicPAD author. DynamicPAD is available at the DynamicPAD website.
- Code signing is a technology that is used by developers to digitally sign their products. Versions of Microsoft Windows since Windows XP Service Pack 2 show a warning when the user installs unsigned software. This is typically offered as a security measure to prevent untrusted software from potentially infecting the machine with malware. However, critics see this technology as part of a tactic to delegitimize independent software development by requiring hefty upfront fees and a review process before software can be distributed.

== See also ==
- Association of Software Professionals
- Careware
- Keygen
