= Vidmeter =

Viral video analytics service

- Type: Web software company
- Industry: Internet
- Founded: 2007
- Founder: Bri Holt
- Headquarters: San Diego, California

Vidmeter was a viral video analytics service that launched in 2007. The site tracked the top 100 Internet videos across multiple Internet video websites such as YouTube and Vimeo. During the lawsuit Viacom International Inc. v. YouTube, Inc., Vidmeter published a study showing Viacom videos accounted for a relatively small portion of YouTube's view count. In 2008, Vidmeter was acquired by Visible Measures for an undisclosed sum.
