= Bri Holt =

American inventor and businessman

- Occupations: Internet Entrepreneur, Inventor
- Known for: Founding Engrade and Vidmeter

Bri Holt is an American inventor and businessman. He is best known for founding Engrade, a Santa Monica-based education technology startup. Holt founded Engrade in 2003 as a high school student trying to build a way for his own teachers to share students' grades online. Engrade was acquired by McGraw-Hill Education in January 2014.

In 2006, Holt founded SocialMeter, the first social media analytics service. In 2007, SocialMeter was acquired by AdaptiveBlue, a startup backed by venture capital firm Union Square Ventures.

In 2007, Holt pioneered the new field of viral video analytics, patenting a method for determining Internet video viewing time. Holt founded Vidmeter, an online video analytics platform, later acquired by Visible Measures in January 2008.

In 2020, Holt was issued a patent entitled Hyperpiler.

In 2025, Holt developed a knowledge graph query language called Memelang.
