= GENtle =

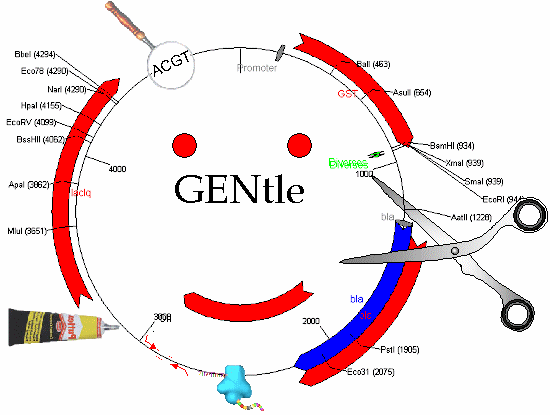
- Developer: Magnus Manske
- Stable release: 1.9.0 / April 7, 2006
- Operating system: Mac OS X, Windows, Linux
- Type: Molecular biology toolkit
- License: Free software GPL
- Website: gentle.magnusmanske.de; github.com/magnusmanske/gentle-m
- Repository: github.com/GENtle-persons/gentle-m

GENtle is a free software under GPL license.

== Features ==
GENtle is an equivalent to the proprietary Vector NTI, a tool for molecular biologists to analyze and edit DNA sequence files. Invitrogens' removal of the free-of-cost academic licence for Vector NTI v11 has had a severe impact on many molecular biology labs that have come to rely on that tool, which led to vendor lock-in effects, which angered many molecular biologists. The GENtle code is developed and maintained by Magnus Manske. By design, GENtle is coded to be cross-platform utilizing wxGTK.
