= Engrade =

Educational technology company

- Website type: Learning management system, Educational assessment
- Owner: McGraw-Hill Education
- Website: engrade.com
- Commercial: Yes
- Launched: 2003
- Current status: Discontinued

Engrade was an educational technology company that provides online learning management system and educational assessment products to K-12 school districts. Engrade was founded in 2003 and later acquired by McGraw-Hill Education in January 2014. As of March 2015, Engrade ranks in the top 5,000 US websites. The service was discontinued on June 30, 2019.

== History ==
Engrade was founded by Bri Holt as a high school student in 2003. The company later received 2 rounds of venture capital funding totaling $8 million from Javelin Venture Partners, Rethink Education, Kapor Capital, New Schools Venture Fund, and Samsung Venture Investment Corp. The company grew to a reported 4.5 million users before being acquired by McGraw-Hill Education in January 2014.

== Products ==
Engrade divides its education products into four groups:

- Corebook – a gradebook specifically designed for standards-based grading and Common Core alignment.
- Teach – a school-wide content management system that integrates third-party content providers.
- Assess – a PARCC and SBAC aligned student assessment tool.
- Improve – processes data from Engrade tools and third parties to provide district-level reports about student performance.
