= Alan H. Borning =

American computer scientist

- Born: United States
- Education: Reed College; Stanford University
- Known for: Human–computer interaction Object-oriented programming Constraint programming Programming languages ThingLab
- Awards: ACM Fellow (2001)
- Scientific career
- Fields: Computer science
- Workplaces: University of Washington
- Doctoral students: A. J. Brush
- Website: www.cs.washington.edu/people/faculty/alan-borning

Alan H. Borning is an American computer scientist noted for research on human–computer interaction, object-oriented programming, programming languages, constraint programming languages and systems, and cooperating constraint languages and solvers. His research in human–computer interaction is on designing for human values, including systems to support civic engagement and deliberation, and tools to make public transport easier to use.

== Biography ==
Borning received a Bachelor of Arts (B.A.) in mathematics from Reed College in 1971. He received a Master of Science (M.S.) in computer science from Stanford University in 1974 and a Doctor of Philosophy (Ph.D.) in computer science from Stanford University in 1979.

He then joined the Department of Computer Science at the University of Washington in 1980. As of 2025, he is a professor emeritus there. He is also an adjunct professor in the Information School, and a member of the Interdisciplinary Ph.D. Program in Urban Design and Planning.

He has been a visiting scholar at Xerox EuroPARC in Cambridge, England (1989–1990); Monash University and University of Melbourne in Australia (1997); University of Hamburg in Germany (2003); Ashesi University in Accra, Ghana (2004); and Hasso Plattner Institute in Potsdam, Germany (2010–2011) and then working with their Software Architecture Group on constraint language projects.

== Awards ==
In the year 2001, he became an ACM Fellow, by the Association for Computing Machinery, for contributions to constraint-based languages, systems, and applications, to object-oriented programming; and to understanding issues of computers and society.
