= Association of Software Professionals =

Defunct software developer/vendor trade organization

The Association of Software Professionals (ASP), formerly Association of Shareware Professionals, was a professional association for authors and developers of freeware, commercial, and shareware computer software. It was formed in April 1987, and for a time, it was considered as the most popular trade organization for independent software developers and vendors.

== Overview ==
The ASP developed and maintain the Portable Application Description (PAD) format used to allow software authors to provide product descriptions and specifications to online sources in a standard way. As of 2021, the PAD file specification was utilized by over 40,000 software publishers and a 1000+ PAD supported software catalog websites. The PAD system is popular because web sites can pull updated data from a single file stored on the software author's site. The final release of the PAD specification, v4.0 was released to the public domain as of January 2022.

The ASP also played a role in making FILE_ID.DIZ files a de facto standard.

In 2011, the ASP purchased the rights to the Software Industry Conference from the Software Industry Awards Foundation. The conference was renamed ISVCon.

After a 34-year run, the ASP announced on their website about their decision to cease operations on December 31, 2021, following a membership decision to dissolve the organization. No reason was given with their announcement.
