= Portable Application Description =

Document format for automated software product cataloging

Portable Application Description (PAD) is a machine-readable document format that allows software authors to provide product descriptions and specifications to online sources in a standard format—an XML schema that allows webmasters and program librarians to automate adding new program listings and updating existing listings in their catalog. PAD saves time for both authors and webmasters, while allowing the specification to support the latest changes to operating systems and hardware. The PAD technology is used by more than 6,000 software publishers of downloadable applications covering the Windows, OS X, and Linux operating systems.

The PAD format is a relatively simple XML format that exclusively uses nested elements with no attributes. If multiple languages are represented in a single PAD file, then parsing can be more challenging because leaf tags are duplicated for each language. Each field in the specification has a regular expression associated with it that acts as a constraint on the field. If it matches, the field value is legal and if it fails to match, the field and the PAD file as a whole do not conform to the specification.

A PAD file commonly has a file name extension of .xml or .pad.

PAD was designed by the Association of Software Professionals (ASP) and introduced in 1998. PAD is a worldwide registered trademark of the ASP and managed by the ASP PAD Committee.

== History ==
Version 3.11 was announced on June 12, 2010. The latest specification, version 4.00, developed with the input and feedback of supporting members of the ASP, was announced on December 1, 2012. It replaces version 3.11.

As part of the major upgrade, ASP withdrew all of its free tools while also formally requesting that all PAD editing, submission and related third-party software, be removed or eliminated. In place of these prior third party and freeware tools, a new web-based platform was developed for PAD Specification by AppVisor.com. AppVisor allowed publishers to upgrade their v3.1 PAD files to v4.0. However, the generated PAD file could not be exported, but only submitted directly to some directories. Submitting the XML Pad to websites cost $150 and approving the application/submission cost $36 per year. AppVisor.com has been inaccessible since March 2024.

ASP stopped accepting new members in mid-2020 and formally ceased operations on December 31, 2021. As of April 2024, AppVisor.com ceased operations.

Some software download and directory sites (BrotherSoft.com, Softonic.com, CNET Download.com, Softpedia.com) accept the PAD v4.0 format in addition to the older formats.

== See also ==
- Submission software
