= Andrew Fluegelman =

American publisher, photographer and programmer

- Born: Andrew Cardozo Fluegelman; November 27, 1943
- Disappeared: c. July 6, 1985 (aged 41)
- Occupation: Publisher

Andrew Cardozo Fluegelman (November 27, 1943 – c. July 6, 1985) was an American publisher, photographer, programmer and attorney best known as a pioneer of what is now known as the shareware business model for software marketing. He was also the founding editor of both PC World and Macworld and the leader of the 1970s New Games movement, which advocated the development of noncompetitive games.

== Early life ==
Fluegelman was raised in White Plains, New York. He graduated from Wesleyan 1965 and Yale Law School 1968.

== Career ==
=== Attorney ===
Following graduation, Fluegelman worked in Midtown Manhattan before moving to California and working for a law firm in San Francisco. He was admitted to the State Bar of California in January 1971. He resigned in 1972 without any particular plan about his future.

=== Writing ===
The following year, Fluegelman started working for the Whole Earth Catalog, a job that lasted for about a year. During that time, he separated from his wife and starting living in Sausalito, California. At one point, he fasted for 49 days, drinking only water.

He started writing and publishing books, such as San Francisco Free and Easy and The New Games Book. By 1981 he had published about 15 books, and began writing computer software reviews, the first being for EasyWriter.

=== Publisher ===
In 1981, Fluegelman was the owner and sole employee of The Headlands Press, a small book publisher in Tiburon, California. He had attended an early computer expo in San Francisco in the late 1970s, and after agreeing to publish and coauthor Writing in the Computer Age decided to purchase his first computer. In October, Fluegelman bought one of the first IBM PCs sold in San Francisco, and in two weeks began to write his own accounting program in IBM BASIC, despite never having used a computer before that year. He recalled "I spent the first month [programming], and I loved it".

=== Shareware ===
In 1982 Fluegelman developed PC-Talk, a very popular and successful communications program. He marketed it under a system he called "Freeware" and became known as shareware, which he characterized as "an experiment in economics more than altruism". PC-Talk was licensed under terms that encouraged users to make voluntary payments for the software, and it allowed users to copy and redistribute the software freely as long as the license terms and text were not altered. He collaborated with PC-File developer Jim Knopf to adopt similar names (PC-File was originally "Easy-File"), and prices, for their initial shareware offerings; they also agreed to mention each other's products in their program's documentation.

=== Magazine editor ===
Fluegelman edited PC World magazine from its introduction in 1982 until 1985, and Macworld magazine from its introduction in 1984 until 1985.

== Disappearance ==
Fluegelman suffered from ulcerative colitis. In July 1985, he was prescribed prednisone to treat the condition. Within a few days of beginning to take the medication, he became depressed and agitated. He started profusely apologizing to his colleague for perceived failures. In order to reduce his stress, his employer rearranged his work schedule; Fluegelman's behavior did not improve.

On the afternoon of July 6, 1985, he left his office in Tiburon, California. A week later, his abandoned car was found at the north end of the Golden Gate Bridge near San Francisco. His family held a memorial service for Fluegelman, and he is presumed dead, though his body has never been found. Kevin Strehlo, InfoWorld columnist, submitted a memorial column which mentioned that "friends say a suicide note was found inside" his car. InfoWorld rejected this column, but an online news service published it.

== Works ==
=== Books edited ===
The Headlands Press produced books and negotiated publishing contracts for them with major publishers. Many of the books were designed by Howard Jacobsen and produced by his company, Community Type and Design. This list is arranged by year of book publication:

- The New Games Book

Edited by Andrew Fluegelman and Shoshana Tembeck. A Headlands Press Book, Dolphin/Doubleday (1976). ISBN 0-385-12516-X

- A Traveler's Guide to El Dorado & the Inca Empire

By Meisch, Lynn. A Headlands Press Book. Publisher: Penguin Books New York (1977). ISBN 0-14-046280-5

- Familiar Subjects: Polaroid SX-70 Impressions

By Norman Locks. A Headlands Press Book. HARPER & ROW, PUBLISHERS, San Francisco (1978). ISBN 0-06-250530-0

- How to Make and Sell Your Own Record

By Diane Sward Rapaport. A Headlands Press Book. Putnam, Prentice-Hall (1979). ISBN 0-8256-9932-0

- How to watch a football game

By Frank Barrett; Lynn Barrett. Publisher: New York: Holt, Rinehart, and Winston (1980). ISBN 0-03-056958-3

- Worksteads: Living and Working in the Same Place

By Jeremy Joan Hewes. The Headlands Press, Inc., San Francisco. Doubleday (1981). ISBN 0-385-15995-1

- More New Games

By The New Games Foundation. Main Street Books New York: Dolphin Books/Doubleday & Company (1981). ISBN 0-385-17514-0

- SUSHI

By Mia Detrick, Illustrated by Kathryn Kleinman A Headlands Press Book. Chronicle Books LLC (1983) ISBN 0-87701-238-5

=== Books co-authored ===
- Writing in the Computer Age: Word Processing Skills and Style for Every Writer

By Andrew Fluegelman and Jeremy Joan Hewes. Anchor Press/Doubleday Publishing Group (1983) ISBN 0-385-18125-6

=== Photography ===
- Mime: A Playbook of Silent Fantasy

By Kay Hamblin. The Doubleday Publishing Group (1978) ISBN 0-385-14246-3

== See also ==
- Free software
- List of people who disappeared mysteriously: post-1970
- List of programmers
