= Marc Ewing =

American computer engineer and entrepreneur

- Education: Carnegie Mellon University
- Occupations: Computer engineer, entrepreneur
- Known for: Creator of Red Hat Linux; Co-founder of Red Hat, Inc.

Marc Ewing is an American computer engineer and entrepreneur. He is the creator and originator of the Red Hat brand of software, most notably the Red Hat range of Linux operating system distributions. He was involved in the 86open project in the mid-1990s.

== Early life ==
The son of an IBM programmer, Marc Ewing attended computer camps as a child, and spent time learning to write programs for Apollo and Commodore computers. He graduated from Carnegie Mellon University in 1992. While at CMU, he was known to wear a red hat. Because of his computer expertise, people would ask for help from the "man in the red hat".

== Career ==
Following his college education, Ewing began work as an engineer at IBM. While at IBM, he spent substantial time customizing Linux workstation installations. From this work, he began the Red Hat Linux Project. Ewing and co-founder Bob Young named their software Red Hat after Ewing's red hat.

At the height of the dot com bubble in 1999, Ewing briefly had a net worth of 900 million dollars.

Ewing left Red Hat, and co-founded the mountaineering-focused Alpinist quarterly publication in 2002. He later began competing in desert racing, and co-founded the Riot Racing team in 2008.
