= PC-Talk =

Communications software program

- Operating system: MS-DOS
- Type: Communications software

PC-Talk is a communications software program. It was one of the first three widely popular software products sold via the marketing method that became known as shareware. It was written by Andrew Fluegelman in late 1982, and helped created shareware's sales and marketing methodology.

== History ==
In 1981 Fluegelman was a book publisher and author in the San Francisco Bay area who bought one of the first IBM PCs. He wanted to exchange book drafts with a coauthor but did not find satisfactory telecommunications software, so wrote PC-Talk in IBM BASIC. After friends advised him to sell it, Fluegelman decided to self-publish the software (without copy protection, because he was so new to computer programming that he did not know how).

KQED's pledge drives inspired Fluegelman to try a novel distribution method. He distributed PC-Talk by sending a copy to anyone who sent him a formatted floppy disk. The application encouraged users who liked it to send him $25, but doing so was not obligatory. Fluegelman also encouraged users to make copies for friends, and provided a batch file to do so. Though PC-Talk is regarded as a progenitor of the shareware distribution model, it was labeled at the time both freeware and "user-supported software", and included elements of open-source software (but not free software).

By 1984 Fluegelman reported receiving "dozens of $35 checks" for PC-Talk every day. He described the response as "really overwhelming ... It was literally driving me out of business", forcing him to hire two employees. Fluegelman estimated that up to 50% of users sent him money, and that its being non-commercial caused users to offer suggestions and fixes for flaws, instead of negative reviews. PC-Talk III was sold for $35 instead of being distributed for free; The Headlands Press offered a $25 discount to those who had previously donated. Its source code was available and many derivative works were created by its user community. The CompuServe IBM/PC SIG forum developed "PC-TALK III Version B, Level 850311". Both the user-modified version of the program and the CompuServe distribution point were officially sanctioned by Fluegelman and The Headlands Press, holders of the copyright for PC-TALK. Members of HAL-PC also produced custom versions that supported videotex and IBM 3101 emulation.

== Reception ==
Larry Magid in PC Magazine said that PC-Talk "is elegantly written and performs beautifully. It is easy to use and has all the features I would expect from a communications program".
