= Bob Wallace (computer scientist) =

American philanthropist (1949–2002)

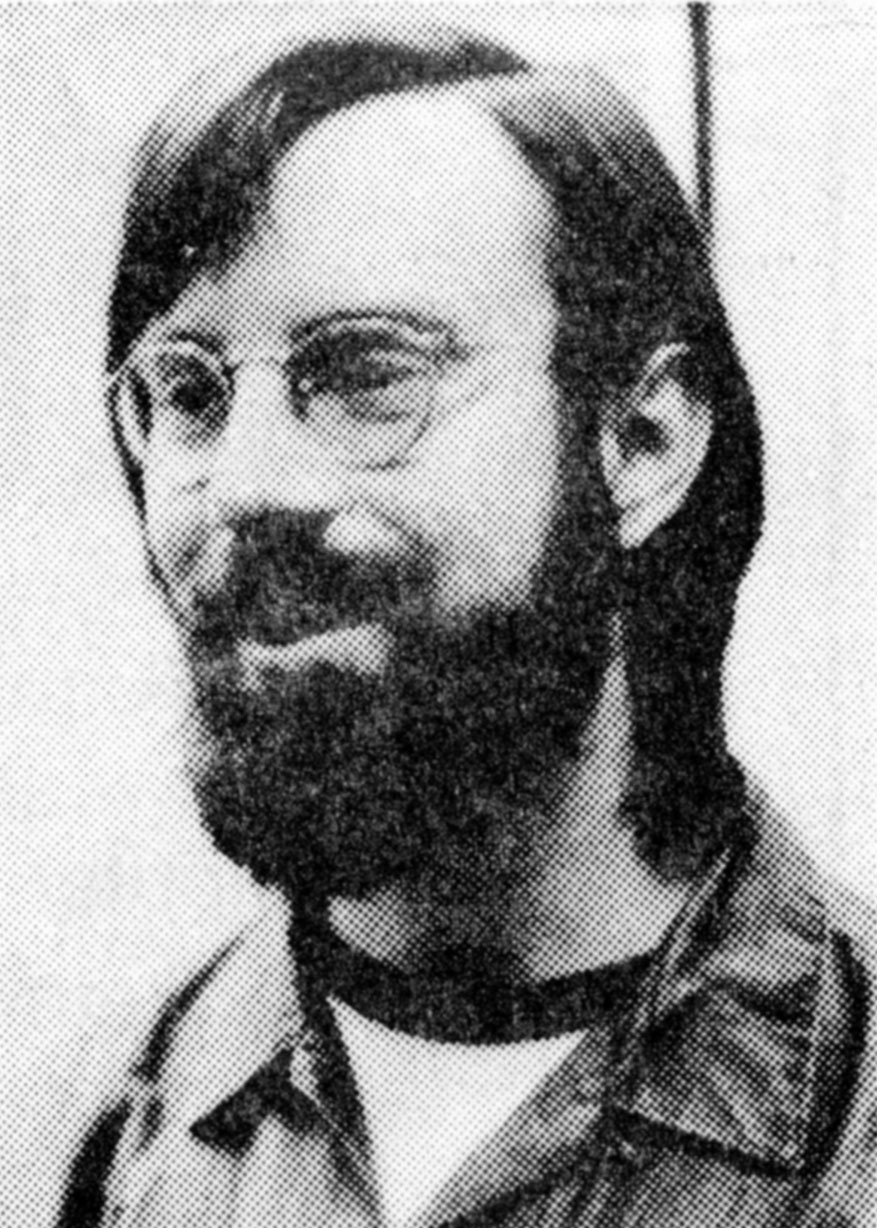
- Wallace in late 1977 (age 28)
- Born: May 29, 1949; Arlington, Virginia
- Died: September 20, 2002 (aged 53); San Rafael, California
- Known for: 9th Microsoft employee Creator of PC-Write; Founder of Quicksoft
- Spouse: Megan Dana-Wallace

Bob Wallace (May 29, 1949 – September 20, 2002) was an American software developer, programmer and the ninth Microsoft employee. He was the first popular user of the term shareware, creator of the word processing program PC-Write, founder of the software company Quicksoft and an "online drug guru" who devoted much time and money to the research of psychedelic drugs.

== Biography ==
Bob Wallace was born in Arlington, Virginia. He first worked on computers as a member of an Explorer Scout troop sponsored by Control Data Corp. in Bethesda, Maryland. His father was an economist who later became Assistant Secretary of the Treasury during the administration of John F. Kennedy.

Beginning in 1967, Wallace attended Brown University, where he worked on the pioneering hypertext File Retrieval and Editing System with Andries van Dam and Ted Nelson. After attending the University of California, Santa Cruz for two years (where he briefly majored in theatre), he received his undergraduate degree (1974) and master's degree (1978) in computer science from the University of Washington.

Wallace worked at the Retail Computer Store in Seattle where he learned about Microsoft after Bill Gates put up a sign advertising for programmers. He joined Microsoft in 1978 as the 9th employee and his first project was to connect a computer to an IBM Selectric typewriter so the company could print software manuals. He was a key developer of TI BASIC. In the late 1970s, Wallace and Gates were known for their practical jokes, and one incident involved breaking into a construction site and driving bulldozers, at one point almost running over Gates's Porsche.

In 1983, Wallace left Microsoft to form Quicksoft and distribute PC-Write using the shareware concept, which he helped originate. Quicksoft soon had 32 employees and $2 million in annual revenue.

Besides Quicksoft, Wallace left Microsoft with stock that was worth as much as $15 million. In 1996 he and his wife Megan Dana-Wallace started Mind Books, a bookstore that offered publications about psychoactive plants and compounds. In 1998, they started the Promind Foundation, which helped support scientific research, public education, and harm reduction efforts related to psychedelics.

Wallace also served on the Board of Directors for the Heffter Research Institute and helped financially support the most important organizations in the field, including the Multidisciplinary Association for Psychedelic Studies (MAPS), the Heffter Research Institute, Erowid (responsible for half of Erowid's funding from 2000 to 2002), DanceSafe, the Center for Cognitive Liberty and Ethics, EcstasyData, Black Rock Arts Foundation, and a number of other projects.

Unexpectedly, he died of pneumonia in San Rafael, California at the age of 53. On hearing of Wallace's death, Paul Allen was quoted as saying, "I remember Bob as a gentle soul who was soft-spoken, but creative, persistent and meticulous in his programming and thinking."

== Northwest Computer Society ==
The March 1976 issues of Byte magazine had a notice about a new computer club in Seattle. Bob Wallace was listed as a contact person. The Northwest Computer Club held meetings at the Pacific Science Center (near Seattle's Space Needle.)

Bob wrote a column for the newsletter called "Bob's Bits". From the February 1978 column:

"Microsoft is hiring systems programmer to work on APL, BASIC, COBOL, and FORTRAN for the 8080, Z-80, 6502, and 8086 as well as operating systems and other interesting projects. Applicants should have at least a bachelor's degree and a year of assembly language experience. Contact Paul Allen at (505) 262-1486, or write to them at 300 San Mateo NE, Albuquerque, NM 87108. Microsoft is the leader in microcomputer systems programming. I've applied myself, by the way."

One of Bob's club projects was to hold a Personal Computer Fair at the Pacific Science Center. The April 1978 show drew over 5000 people and had over 60 computers on display for visitors to use. Shortly after that show, Bob finished his degree and joined Microsoft in Albuquerque, New Mexico. The Fair was repeated in March 1979 and drew over 6000 people.

== See also ==
- History of Microsoft
