= Transam Triton =

British 8-bit computer

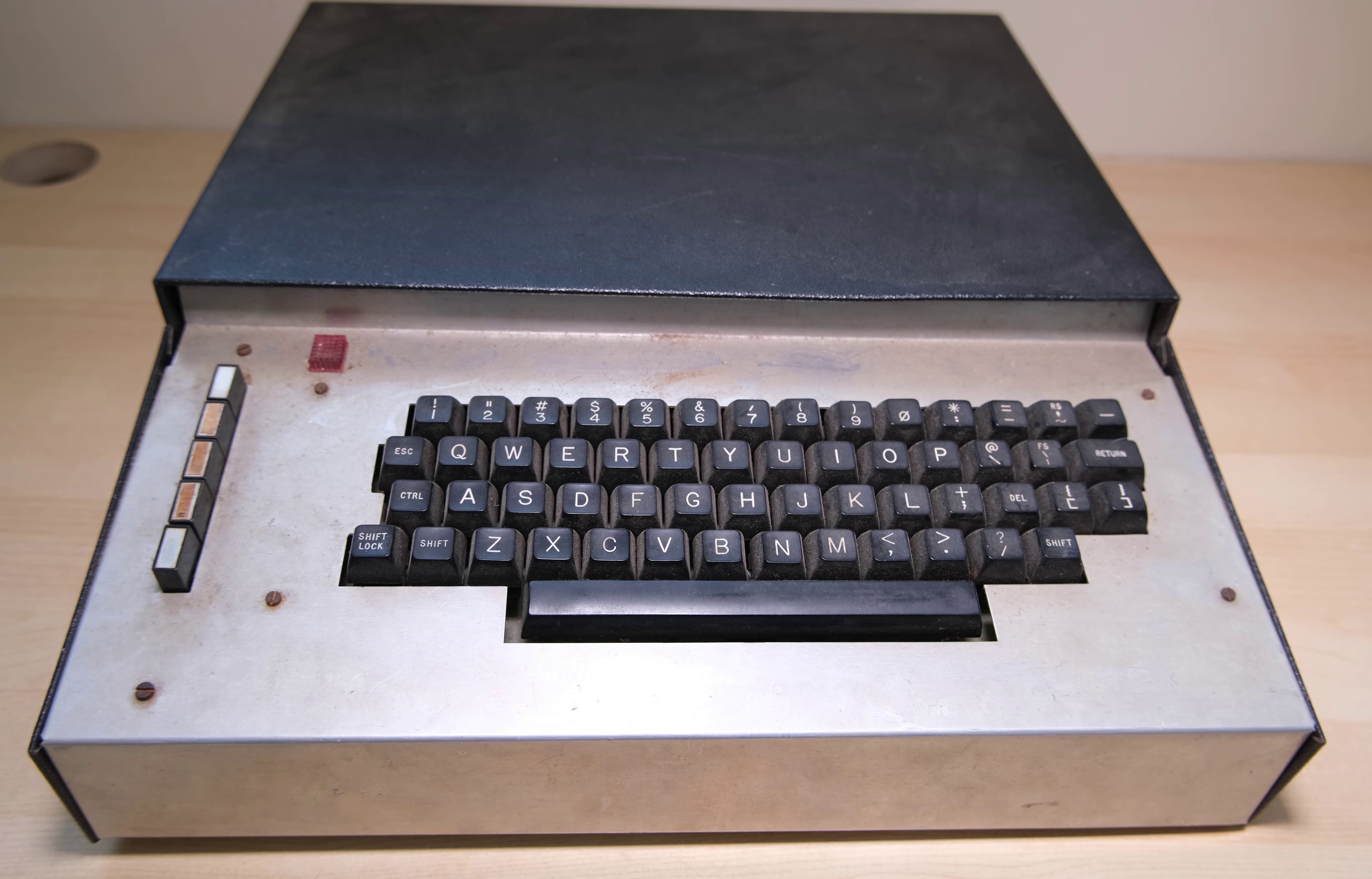
The Transam Triton (image courtesy Happy Little Diodes - YouTube)

The Transam Triton was an early British 8-bit microcomputer announced in 1978 as a partnership between Transam Components and Electronics Today International (ETI) magazine. It appeared in the context of accelerating interest in home computing through the 1970s. The emerging wide availability of single chip microprocessors enabled computing to become affordable to individuals, rather than the preserve of businesses and universities. Several similar home computers arrived around this time such as the Nascom and Newbear 77-68 just prior to the launch of the more well known low cost machines such as the Sinclair ZX80 and ZX81 that helped establish the mainstream market.

As was common at the time, the Triton was originally supplied as a kit of parts for self-assembly by electronics hobbyists but was later offered assembled. It first appeared in the October 1978 edition of ETI magazine with a full description, schematics and assembly instructions following in the November edition. The kit included a case, keyboard, PCB, power supply and ROM chips. An "expansion motherboard" peripheral was available, a board with an additional PSU that plugged into the computer's expansion slot and allowed up to eight cards to be connected. An 8K static RAM card and an 8K EPROM card were also available.

The Triton preceded the convention of 8-bit micros booting to a BASIC prompt and initially presents a machine code monitor on start. This allows memory locations to be inspected, programs to be started by entering the first memory address, and debugging and interaction with the tape I/O. It is possible to develop machine code programs from within the monitor but it is not an assembler; code must be entered as hex digits. An assembler called the Triton Resident Assembly Language Package (TRAP) was available separately. The Triton was supplied with the 2K Tiny BASIC programming language which could be extended with more sophisticated versions. BASIC could be invoked from the monitor.

The machine was sold in multiple configurations, each denoted with an "L" prefix. The cheapest configuration, described in the original magazine articles, supplied a 1K monitor ROM and a 2K BASIC ROM and was originally offered at £286 + VAT in kit form (January 1979 price). Other configurations added extended BASIC and monitor functionality and a Pascal compiler. A bundle was available that supported the then popular CP/M operating system and a disk interface for Shugart 5.25" and 8" floppy drives.

== Technical specifications ==
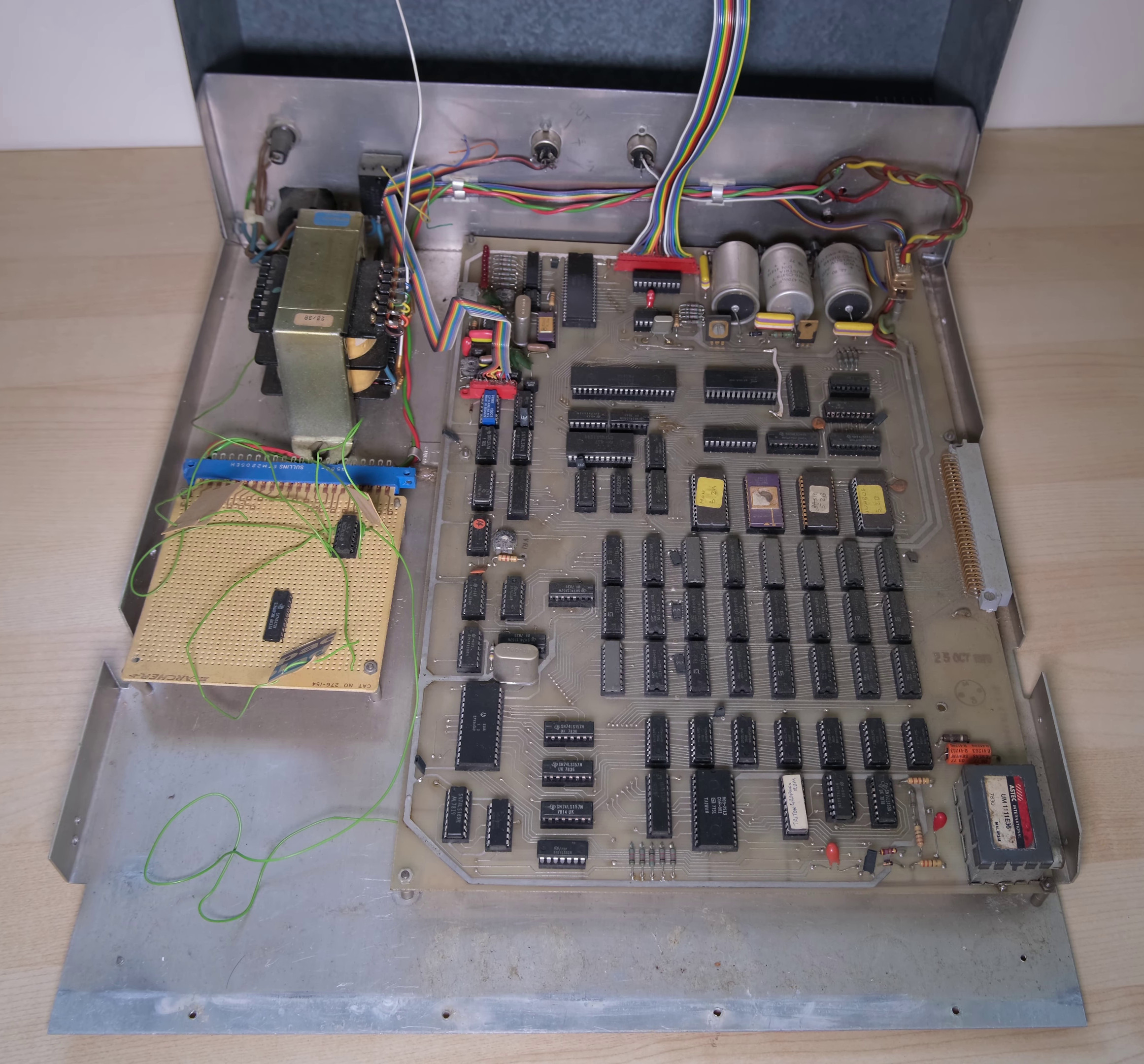
The motherboard of the Transam Triton

- CPU: Intel 8080A (clocked at 0.8Mhz)

- RAM: Up to 4K on-board of which 1K was used for video display

- ROM: Originally supplied with a 1K monitor and 2K "Tiny BASIC" (expandable to 4K on-board)

- Expansion port allowing connection of up to 64KB of additional memory

- 64 graphics characters

- On-board cassette tape interface

- UHF television interface

== Configurations ==
The Triton kit was sold in several bundles

- L4.1: Original base edition with 2K BASIC and 1K monitor ROM

- L5.1/L5.2: 2.5K expanded BASIC and 1.5K Monitor ROM

- L6.1: 7K "scientific" BASIC and 1.5K (later 2K) monitor ROM (supplied on an expansion card)

- L7.1/L7.2: 8K BASIC

- L8.1/L8.2: Pascal compiler in a 20K ROM and 4K monitor ROM

- L9.1/L9.2: CP/M compatible disk interface supporting 4x 5.25" and 8" floppy drives
