= Homebrew computer =

Homebrew computer may refer to:

- Homebuilt computer
- Homebrew Computer Club
