= Electronics Today International =

Magazine

- Cover of the January 1981 issue
- Categories: Electronics, computers
- Frequency: Monthly
- First issue: April 1971
- Final issue Number: April 1990; 20 (4)
- Country: Australia, United Kingdom

Electronics Today International or ETI was a magazine for electronics hobbyists and professionals.

Originally started in Australia in April 1971, ETI was published in the UK in 1972. From there, it expanded to various European countries, including France (where it was started in November 1972) and over to Canada.

It was one of the first magazines to publish circuit diagrams for building homebrew computer systems. They also published a monthly series of articles for their "system 68" microcomputer based on the Motorola 6800 Microprocessor, most of them written by John Miller-Kirkpatrick, the dozen or so articles described in detail how to build a M6800 based microcomputer, including a VDU. In that sense it was one of the first computer magazines.

== The 1970s ==
ETI was launched by Modern Magazines, a publisher of specialist magazines based in Rushcutters' Bay, Sydney. The magazine was started at the suggestion of Kim Ryrie (later of Fairlight CMI fame), the electronics-enthusiast son of Colin Ryrie, who owned the publishing company, but who died in a boating accident the following year. They hired Collyn Rivers (ex de Havilland Propellers and General Motors Research) as editor. Collyn's initial research indicated that the publication would only be financially viable if it could be published in at least two countries. This recommendation was accepted.

The magazine then set up a development laboratory to produce designs for publications in all future editions. Whereas most other magazines in this market relied on designs submitted by freelance amateur designers, ETI's editor could commission cutting-edge designs from the in-house laboratory, which was run to professional standards by Barry Wilkinson. It is believed that it was, in part, the quality of these designs which set ETI apart for its competition, and ensured its success, initially in Australia and then in overseas markets. Collyn Rivers states that what assisted the magazine's success was having a long established and very high quality competitor in Electronics Australia. He is on record as saying that 'whilst I visualised ETI as being very different, Electronics Australia always remained by far our most serious competitor worldwide.'

The Australian edition sold well from the start (at approximately 40,000 copies/month). The first overseas edition was published (a year after the Australian edition), by a subsidiary of Modern Magazines. There were initial teething problems, but it began to work following the appointment of Halvor Moorshead as editor/publisher for the UK market. Halvor syndicated the magazine in Germany and the Netherlands. In 1978 ETI entered the North American market with a Canadian edition. In the Netherlands a Dutch version was published as "electronica top internationaal" by "Radio Rotor", a mail order company for electronic hobby equipment located in Den Dolder (the Netherlands) and Brussels (Belgium), later they moved shop to Amsterdam where they are still operational.

In 1980, Collyn Rivers added an Indonesian language edition. There was also, for a time, a pirated Indian edition that Collyn Rivers decided 'not to know about' on the basis that it was needed but non-affordable by its young readers.

Initially, most editorial material, including the constructional projects were sourced from Australia. Soon they realised that, apart from spending time in Australia, this did not offer enough opportunity for its overseas staff. Whilst the major constructional projects continued to be produced in Sydney, the overseas editions were encouraged to be free to interchange material, but to be otherwise editorially independent. This proved highly successful.

The ETI network offered valuable travel opportunities for its young staff. Steve Braidwood, who worked on the UK edition as a student in 1973 and joined as assistant editor in 1974, went to Sydney in 1976-77 as acting editor and then to Canada in 1977–1979 as editor and publisher. He was succeeded as editor in Canada by Graham Wideman (see ). Unusually for a publishing operation, Collyn Rivers preferred to hire people who had expertise in specific fields other than journalism. This provided greater subsequent employment opportunities: ETI Australia's assistant editor Jane Mckenzie, for example, subsequently became editor of Choice; Barry Wilkinson's successor, Alan Waite, ended up owning one of Australia's largest security equipment companies. Another later gained a physics Ph.D.

In 1976, the Australian edition was named by Union Radio Presse Internationale as 'The Best Electronics Magazine in the World'. It is still the only Australian developed magazine to have had successful overseas editions.

The Australian group also produced a number of associated magazines including Sonics, Comdec Business Technology, Australia CB, Business Computing, Your Computer and many others some of which had overseas edition counterparts.

In November 1978 the British edition of ETI published an article describing the schematics and other technical details (including PCB) of an Intel 8080 based single board computer called the Transam Triton, which could also be bought as a kit, including a specially designed metal enclosure with a built in PSU and 56-key keyboard. Initially a single board system, with 4K firmware, (1.5 Monitor, and 2.5K BASIC) and 3K of RAM and a 64x16 VDU, it could be expanded using a "passive motherboard" with eight slots with 64-pins DIN connectors for Eurocard shaped expansion cards, this way the system could be expanded to a complete CP/M based system.

In 1980 the Triton was followed up by the Zilog Z80 and S-100 bus based Transam Tuscan. Transam ("Transam Components Limited") also wrote a Pascal compiler, "TCL Pascal" for the Triton, consisting of a 4K monitor/editor in ROM, and a 20K compiler for a total of 24K ROM. TCL Pascal was also available on a single 8-inch floppy disk, and ported to other systems, like the 6502-based Commodore PET.

At much the same time, the Australian edition developed (in conjunction with Kim Ryrie) a complex music synthesiser, that subsequently had its commercially further-developed counterpart: Kim Ryrie's Fairlight Synthesizer.

In 1980, Kim Ryrie sold the overseas editions, each to individual owners. The Canadian operation was bought by Halvor Moorshead in 1979, when the Australian company was acquired by Kerry Packer's Australian Consolidated Press. The UK company was sold to Argus Specialist Press (a subsidiary of BET).

The subsequent edition editors and Collyn Rivers (previously managing editor of them all), with Halvor Moorshead's encouragement and assistance attempted, with some success, to continue to maintain the previous cooperation, but this came to an end when, in early 1982, ACP sold the Australian group to Federal Publishing. Collyn left Federal shortly after to form a specialist technology publishing company with designer Alison White, and later his own publishing company, Caravan & Motorhome Books – which still (March 2014) exists. He also doubled as technical contributor to The Bulletin from 1982–1990, and later founded Australian Communications.

Federal Publishing also purchased the long established Electronics Australia, but closed both publications some years later.

ETI and Electronics Australia still survive in Australia – incorporated in Silicon Chip, formerly run by ex-Electronics Australia Editor Leo Simpson, who bought the copyright to all editorial material of both publications, and now Nicholas Vinen.

Halvor Moorshead remained in Canada where he ran successful genealogy publications and later a local community radio station. He died on 7 March 2014.

== The 1980s and 1990s ==
Throughout the 1980s, ETI featured type-in computer programs submitted by readers. The last issue, Volume 20, Number 4, was published in April 1990.

In February 1999 Wimborne Publishing, who published the rival magazine Everyday Practical Electronics, acquired its UK rival ETI.
