= Home computer =

Class of microcomputers

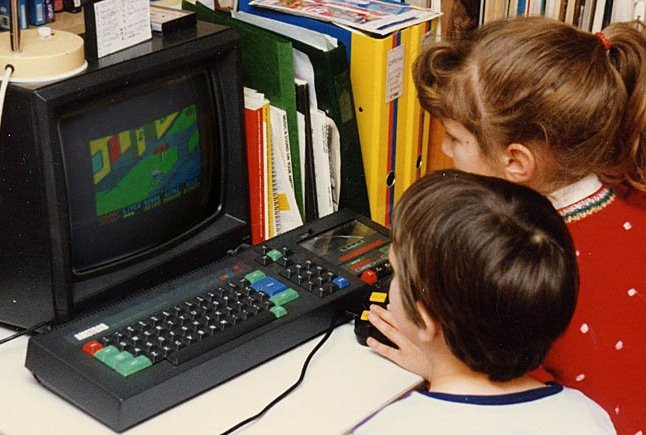
Children playing Paperboy on an Amstrad CPC 464 in 1988

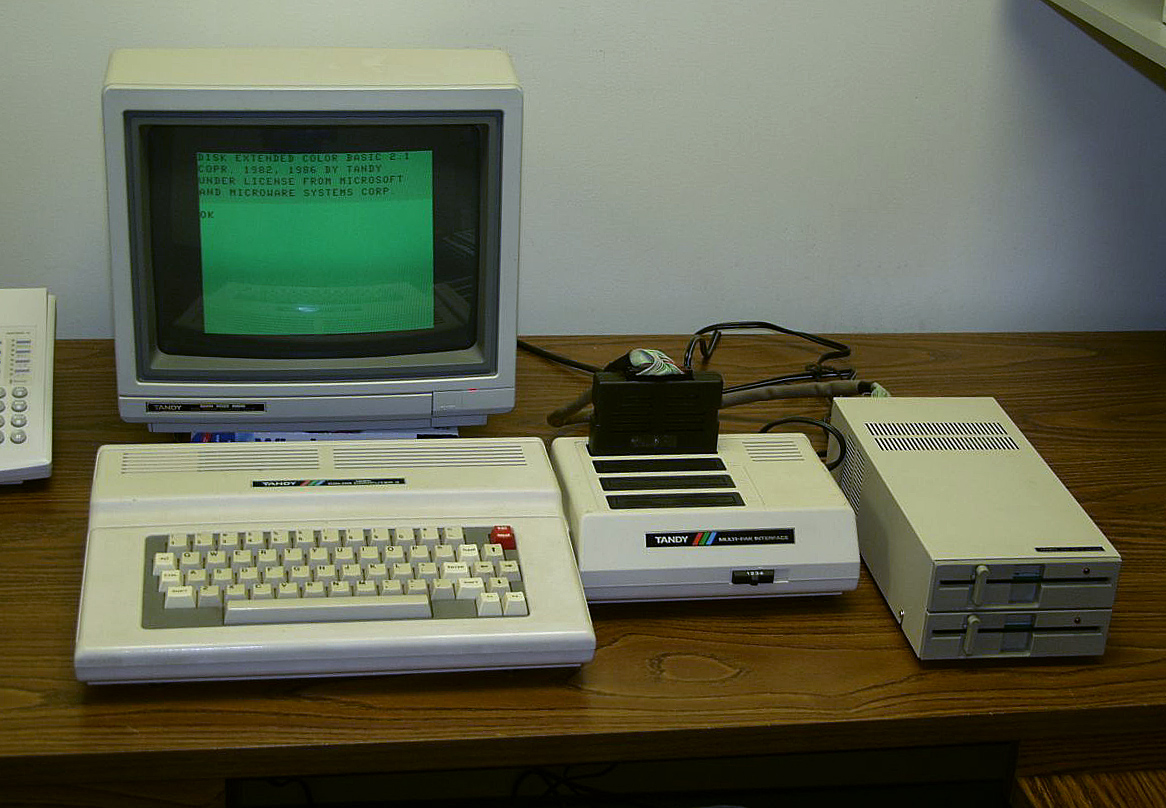
The often sprawling nature of a well-outfitted home computer is evident with this Tandy Color Computer 3, released in 1986.

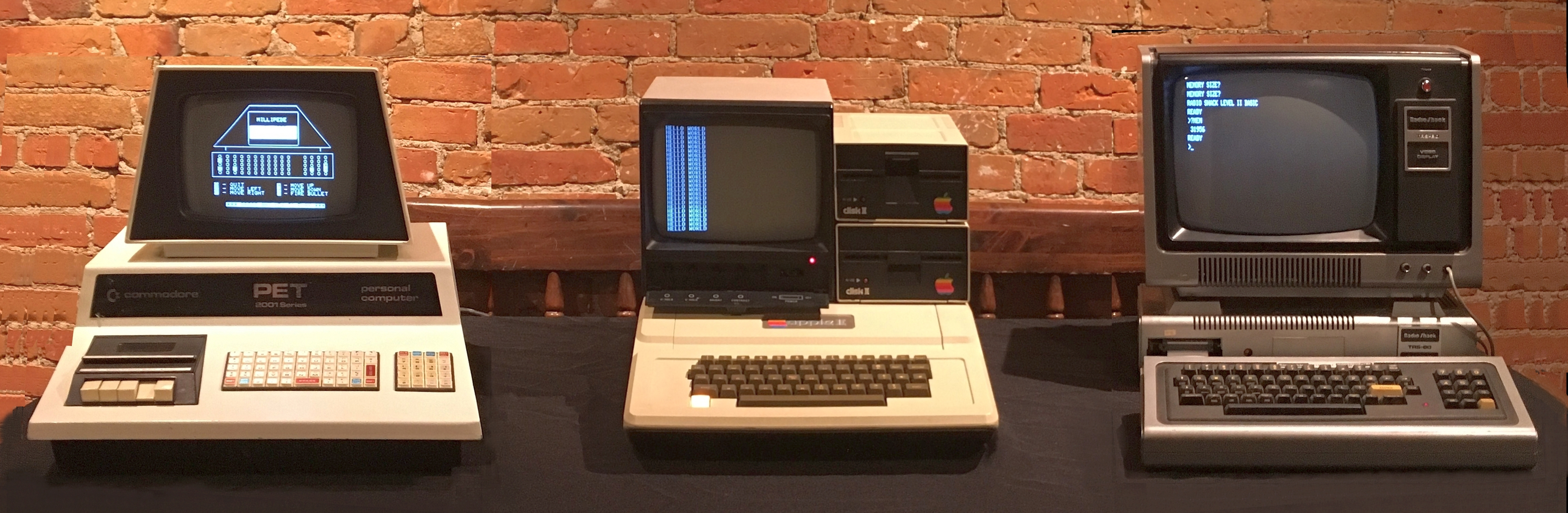
The three computers Byte magazine retrospectively called the "1977 Trinity" (L-R): Commodore PET 2001-8, Apple II, TRS-80 Model I.

Home computers were a class of microcomputers that entered the market in 1977 and became common during the 1980s. They were marketed to consumers as affordable and accessible computers that, for the first time, were intended for the use of a single, non-technical user. These computers were a distinct market segment that typically cost much less than business, scientific, or engineering-oriented computers of the time, such as those running CP/M or the IBM PC, and were generally less powerful in terms of memory and expandability. However, a home computer often had better graphics and sound than contemporary business computers. Their most common uses were word processing, playing video games, and programming.

Home computers were usually sold already manufactured in stylish metal or plastic enclosures. However, some home computers also came as commercial electronic kits, like the Sinclair ZX80, which were both home and home-built computers since the purchaser could assemble the unit from a kit.

Advertisements in the popular press for early home computers were rife with possibilities for their practical use in the home, from cataloging recipes to personal finance to home automation, but these were seldom realized in practice. For example, using a typical 1980s home computer as a home automation appliance would require the computer to be kept powered on at all times and dedicated to this task. Personal finance and database use required tedious data entry.

By contrast, advertisements in the specialty computer press often simply listed specifications, assuming a knowledgeable user who already had applications in mind. If no packaged software was available for a particular application, the home computer user could program one – provided they had invested the requisite hours to learn computer programming, as well as the idiosyncrasies of their system. Since most systems arrived with the BASIC programming language included on the system ROM, it was easy for users to get started creating their own simple applications. Many users found programming to be a fun experience and introduction to the world of digital technology.

The line between 'business' and 'home' computer market segments vanished completely once IBM PC compatibles became commonly used in the home, since now both categories of computers typically use the same processor architectures, peripherals, operating systems, and applications. Often, the only difference may be the sales outlet through which they are purchased. Another change from the home computer era is that the once-common endeavor of writing one's own software programs has almost vanished from home computer use.

== Background ==
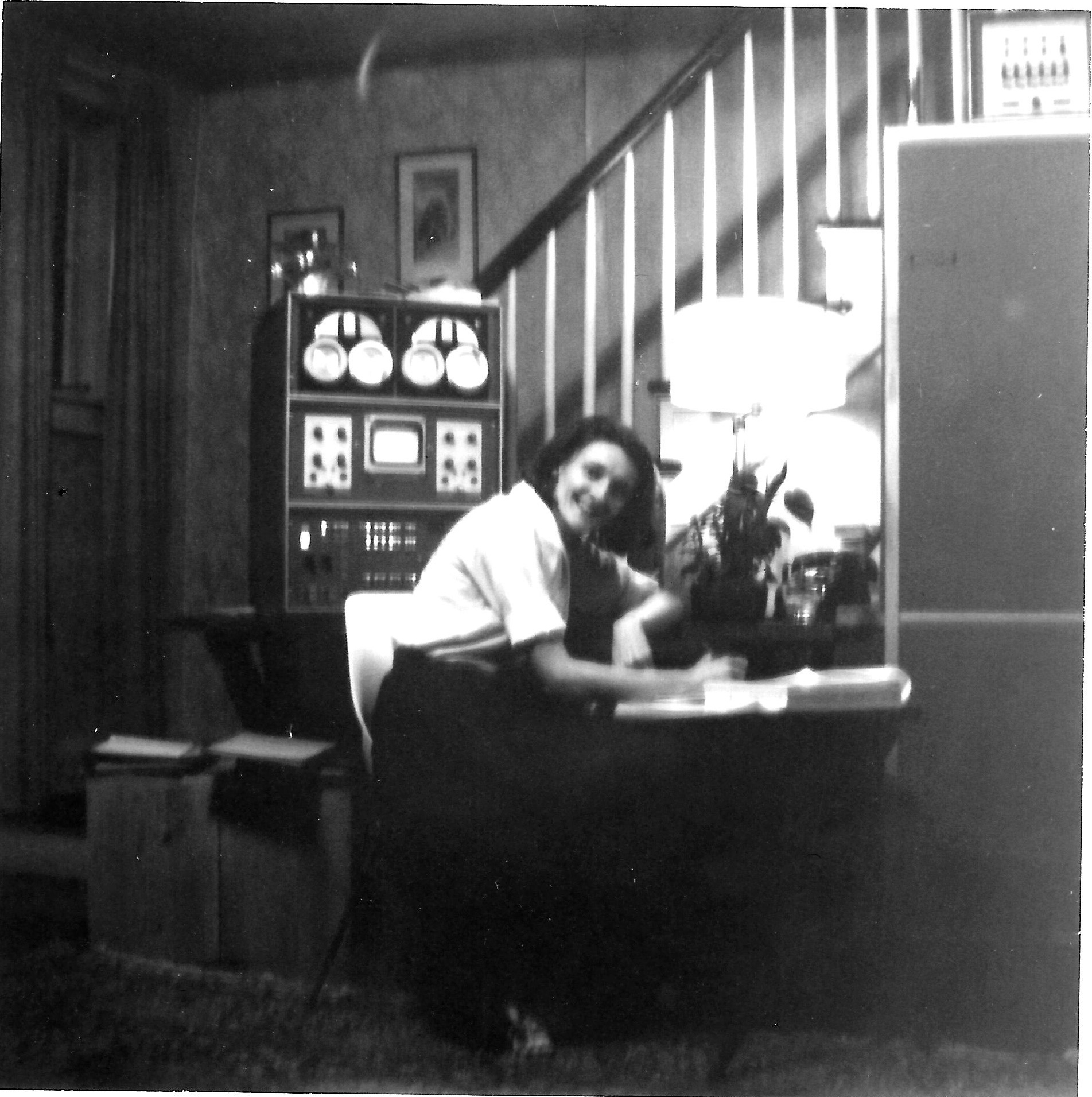
Mary Allen Wilkes working on the LINC at home in 1965; thought to be the first home computer user

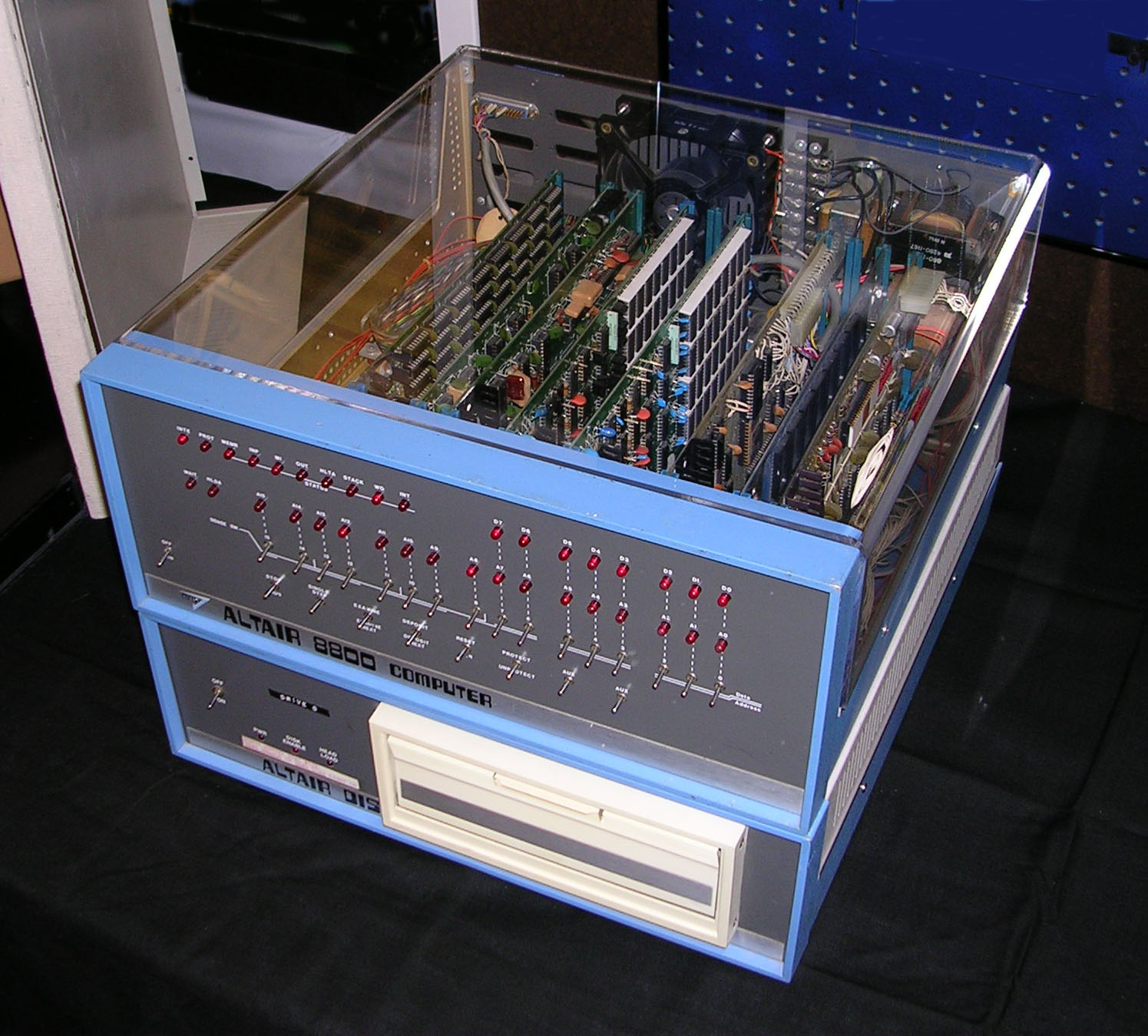
The 1974 MITS Altair 8800 computer (atop extra 8-inch floppy disk drive): one of the earliest computers affordable and marketed to private / home use from 1975, but many buyers got a kit, to be hand-soldered and assembled.

As early as 1965, some experimental projects, such as Jim Sutherland's ECHO IV, explored the possible utility of a computer in the home. In 1969, the Honeywell Kitchen Computer was marketed as a luxury gift item, and would have inaugurated the era of home computing, but none were sold.

Computers became affordable for the general public in the 1970s due to the mass production of the microprocessor, starting in 1971. Early microcomputers such as the Altair 8800 had front-mounted switches and diagnostic lights (nicknamed "blinkenlights") to control and indicate internal system status, and were often sold in kit form to hobbyists. These kits would contain an empty printed circuit board which the buyer would fill with the integrated circuits, other individual electronic components, wires and connectors, and then hand-solder all the connections.

While several early home computers such as the Sinclair ZX80 and Acorn Atom could be bought either in kit form or assembled, most home computers were only sold pre-assembled. They were enclosed in plastic or metal cases similar in appearance to typewriter or hi-fi equipment enclosures, which were more familiar and attractive to consumers than the industrial metal card-cage enclosures used by the Altair and similar computers. The keyboard – a feature lacking on the Altair – was usually built into the same case as the motherboard. Ports for plug-in peripheral devices such as a video display, cassette tape recorders, joysticks, and (later) disk drives were either built-in or available on expansion cards. Although the Apple II had internal expansion slots, most other home computer models' expansion arrangements were through externally-accessible 'expansion ports' that also served as a place to plug in cartridge-based games. Usually, the manufacturer would sell peripheral devices designed to be compatible with their computers as extra-cost accessories. Peripherals and software were not often interchangeable between different brands of home computers, or even between successive models of the same brand.

To save the cost of a dedicated monitor, the home computer would often connect through an RF modulator to the family TV set, which served as both video display and sound system.

The rise of the home computer also led to a fundamental shift during the early 1980s in where and how computers were purchased. Traditionally, microcomputers were obtained by mail order or were purchased in person at general electronics retailers like RadioShack. Silicon Valley, in the vanguard of the personal computer revolution, was the first place to see the appearance of new retail stores dedicated to selling only computer hardware, computer software, or both, and also the first place where such stores began to specialize in particular platforms.

By 1982, an estimated 621,000 home computers were in American households, at an average sales price of US$530 (equivalent to $1,768 in 2025). After the success of the Radio Shack TRS-80, the Commodore PET, and the original Apple II in 1977, almost every manufacturer of consumer electronics rushed to introduce a home computer. Large numbers of new machines of all types began to appear during the late 1970s and early 1980s. Mattel, Coleco, Texas Instruments, and Timex, none of which had any prior connection to the computer industry, all had short-lived home computer lines in the early 1980s. Some home computers were more successful. The BBC Micro, ZX Spectrum, Atari 8-bit computers, and Commodore 64 sold many units over several years and attracted third-party software development.

Almost universally, home computers had a BASIC interpreter combined with a line editor in permanent read-only memory, which one could use to type in BASIC programs and execute them immediately, or save them to tape or disk. In direct mode, the BASIC interpreter was also used as the user interface, and given tasks such as loading, saving, managing, and running files. One exception was the Jupiter Ace, which had a Forth interpreter instead of BASIC. A built-in programming language was seen as a requirement for any computer of the era, and was the main feature setting home computers apart from video game consoles.

Still, home computers competed in the same market as the consoles. A home computer was often seen as simply a higher-end purchase than a console, adding abilities and productivity potential to what would still be mainly a gaming device. A common marketing tactic was to show a computer system and console playing games side by side, then emphasizing the computer's greater ability by showing it running user-created programs, education software, word processing, spreadsheet, and other applications, while the game console showed a blank screen or continued playing the same repetitive game. Another capability home computers had that game consoles of the time lacked was the ability to access remote services over telephone lines by adding a serial port interface, a modem, and communication software. Though it could be costly, it permitted the computer user to access services like Compuserve, and private or corporate bulletin board systems and viewdata services to post or read messages, or to download or upload software. Some enthusiasts with computers equipped with large storage capacity and a dedicated phone line operated bulletin boards of their own. This capability anticipated the internet by nearly 20 years.

Some game consoles offered "programming packs" consisting of a version of BASIC in a ROM cartridge. Atari's BASIC Programming for the Atari 2600 was one of these. For the ColecoVision console, Coleco even announced an expansion module which would convert it into a full-fledged computer system. The Magnavox Odyssey² console had a built-in keyboard to support its C7420 Home Computer Module. Among third-generation consoles, Nintendo's Family Computer offered Family BASIC (sold only in Japan), which included a keyboard that could be connected to an external tape recorder to load and store programs.

Books of type-in program listings like BASIC Computer Games were available, dedicated for the BASICs of most models of computer, with titles along the lines of 64 Amazing BASIC Games for the Commodore 64. While most of the programs in these books were short and simple games or demos, some titles, such as Compute!'s SpeedScript series, contained productivity software that rivaled commercial packages. To avoid the tedious process of typing in a program listing from a book, these books would sometimes include a mail-in offer from the author to obtain the programs on disk or cassette for a few dollars. Before the Internet, and before most computer owners had a modem, books were a popular and low-cost means of software distribution – one that had the advantage of incorporating its own documentation. These books also served a role in familiarizing new computer owners with the concepts of programming; some titles added suggested modifications to the program listings for the user to carry out. Applying a patch to modify software to be compatible with one's system, or writing a utility program to fit one's needs, was a skill every advanced computer owner was expected to have.

During the peak years of the home computer market, scores of models were produced, usually as individual design projects with little or no thought given to compatibility between different manufacturers, or even within product lines of the same manufacturer. Except for the Japanese MSX standard, the concept of a computer platform was still forming, with most companies considering rudimentary BASIC language and disk format compatibility sufficient to claim a model as "compatible". Things were different in the business world, where cost-conscious small business owners had been using CP/M running on Z80-based computers from Osborne, Kaypro, Morrow Designs, and a host of other manufacturers. For many of these businesses, the development of the microcomputer made computing and business software affordable where they had not been before.

Introduced in August 1981, the IBM Personal Computer would eventually supplant CP/M as the standard platform used in business. This was largely due to the IBM name and the system's 16-bit open architecture, which expanded maximum memory tenfold, and also encouraged production of third-party clones. In the late 1970s, the 6502-based Apple II had carved out a niche for itself in business, thanks to the industry's first killer app, VisiCalc, released in 1979. However, the Apple II would quickly be displaced for office use by IBM PC compatibles running Lotus 1-2-3. Apple Computer's 1980 Apple III was underwhelming, and although the 1984 release of the Macintosh introduced the modern GUI to the market, it was not common until IBM-compatible computers adopted it. Throughout the 1980s, businesses large and small adopted the PC platform, leading, by the end of the decade, to sub-US$1000 IBM PC XT-class white box machines, usually built in Asia and sold by US companies like PCs Limited.

In 1980, Wayne Green, the publisher of Kilobaud Microcomputing, recommended that companies avoid the term "home computer" in their advertising, as it "I feel is self-limiting for sales...I prefer the term "microcomputers" since it doesn't limit the uses of the equipment in the imagination of the prospective customers". With the exception of Tandy, most computer companies – even those with a majority of sales to home users – agreed, avoiding the term "home computer" because of its association with the image of, as Compute! wrote, "a low-powered, low-end machine primarily suited for playing games". Apple consistently avoided stating that it was a home-computer company, and described the IIc as "a serious computer for the serious home user", despite competing against IBM's PCjr home computer. John Sculley denied that his company sold home computers; rather, he said, Apple sold "computers for use in the home". In 1990, the company reportedly refused to support joysticks on its low-cost Macintosh LC and IIsi computers to prevent customers from considering them as "game machines".

Although the Apple II and Atari computers are functionally similar, Atari's home-oriented marketing resulted in a game-heavy library with much less business software. By the late 1980s, many mass merchants sold video game consoles like the Nintendo Entertainment System, but no longer sold home computers.

Toward the end of the 1980s, clones also became popular with non-corporate customers. Inexpensive, highly compatible clones succeeded where the PCjr had failed. Replacing the hobbyists who had made up the majority of the home computer market were, as Compute! described them, "people who want to take work home from the office now and then, play a game now and then, learn more about computers, and help educate their children". By 1986, industry experts predicted an "MS-DOS Christmas", and the magazine stated that clones threatened Commodore, Atari, and Apple's domination of the home-computer market.

The declining cost of IBM compatibles on the one hand, and the greatly increased graphics, sound, and storage abilities of fourth generation video game consoles such as the Sega Genesis and Super Nintendo Entertainment System on the other, combined to cause the market segment for home computers to vanish by the early 1990s in the US. In Europe, the home computer remained a distinct presence for a few years more, with the low-end models of the 16-bit Amiga and Atari ST families being the dominant players, but by the mid-1990s, even the European market had dwindled. The Dutch government even ran a program that allowed businesses to sell computers tax-free to its employees, often accompanied by home training programs. Naturally, these businesses chose to equip their employees with the same systems they themselves were using. Today, a computer bought for home use anywhere will be very similar to those used in offices; made by the same manufacturers, with compatible peripherals, operating systems, and application software.

== Technology ==
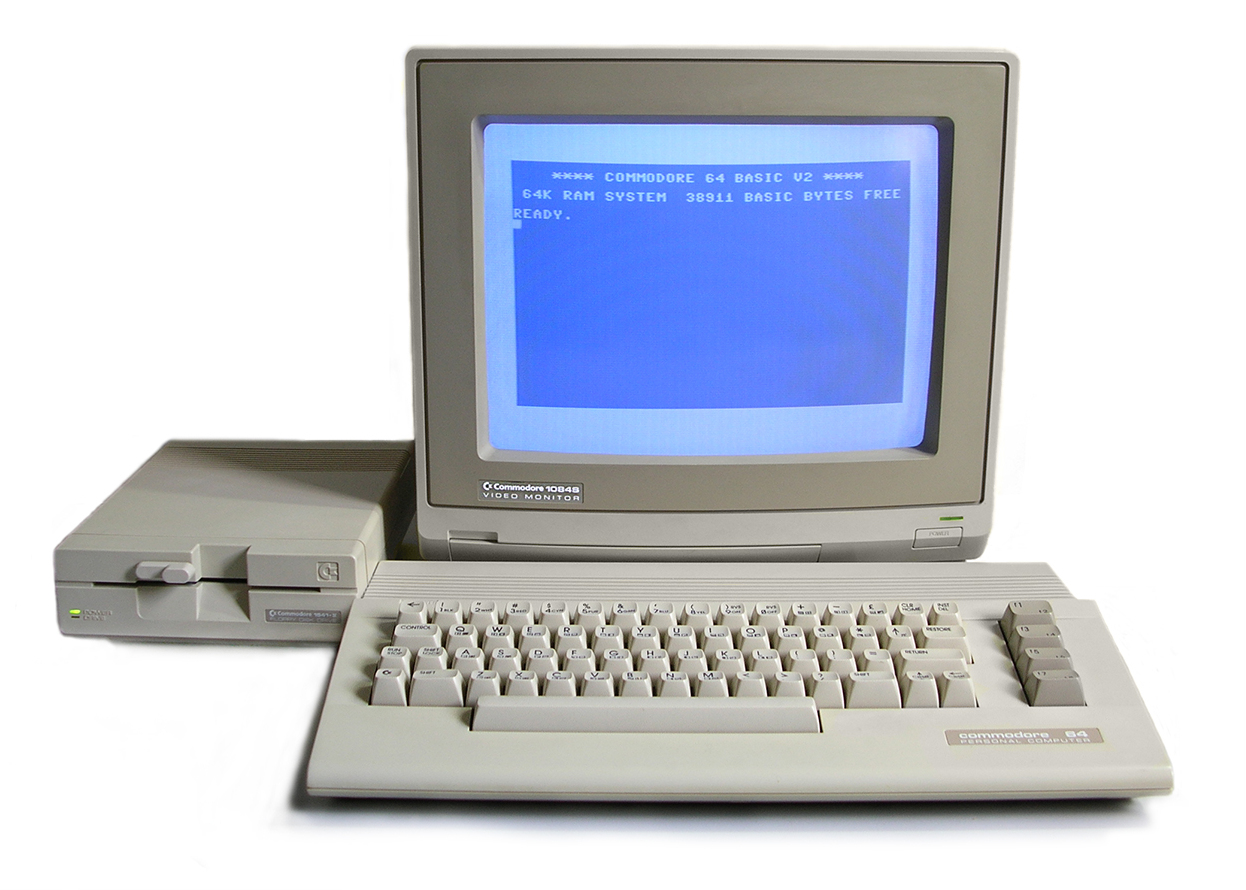
A Commodore 64C system, showing the basic layout of a typical home computer system of the era. Pictured are the CPU/keyboard unit, floppy disk drive, and dedicated color monitor. Many systems also had a dot matrix printer for producing paper output.

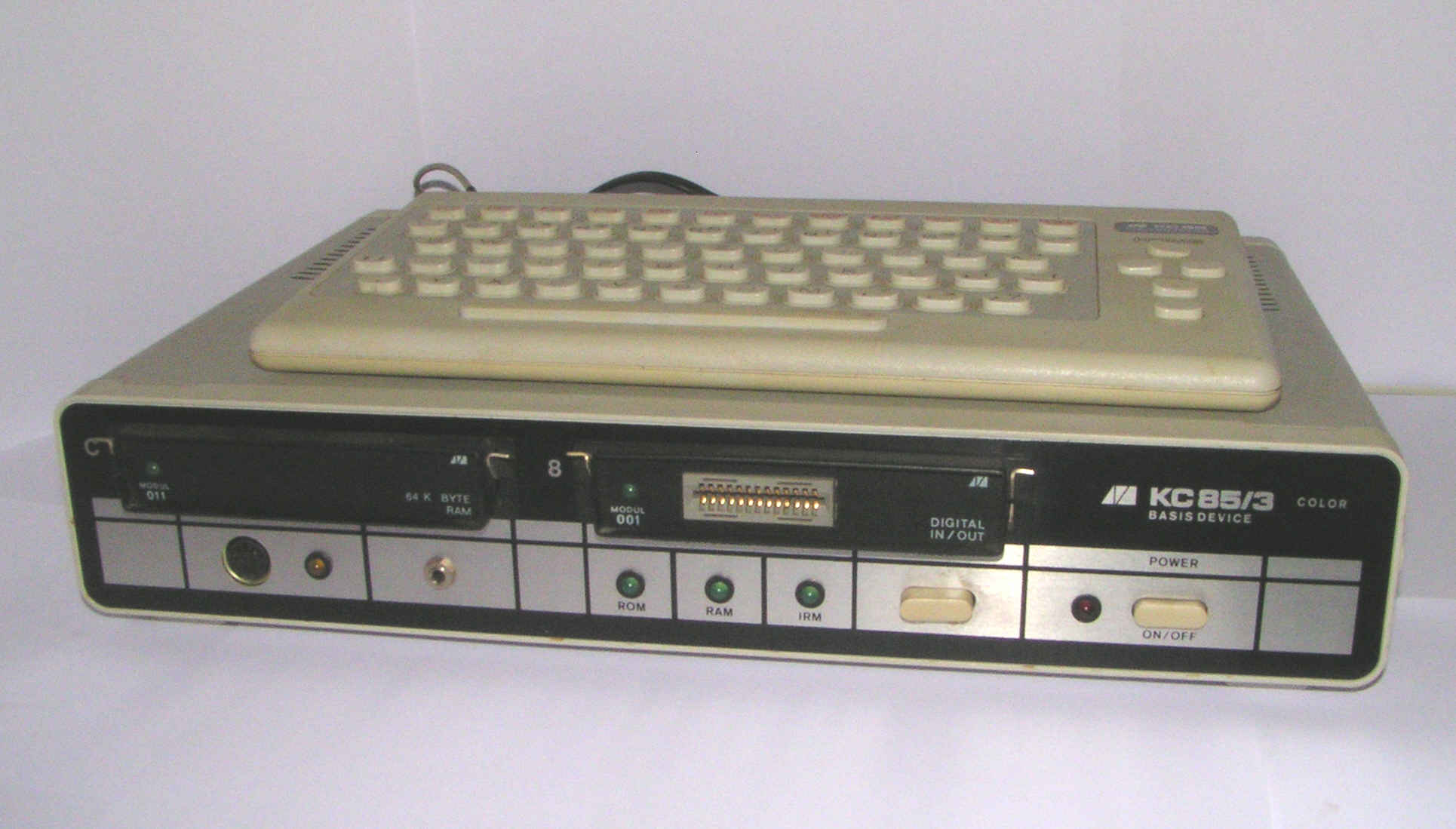
An East German KC 85/3 with its keyboard placed on top, released by VEB Mikroelektronik Mühlhausen 1976 and based on a Zilog Z80 clone

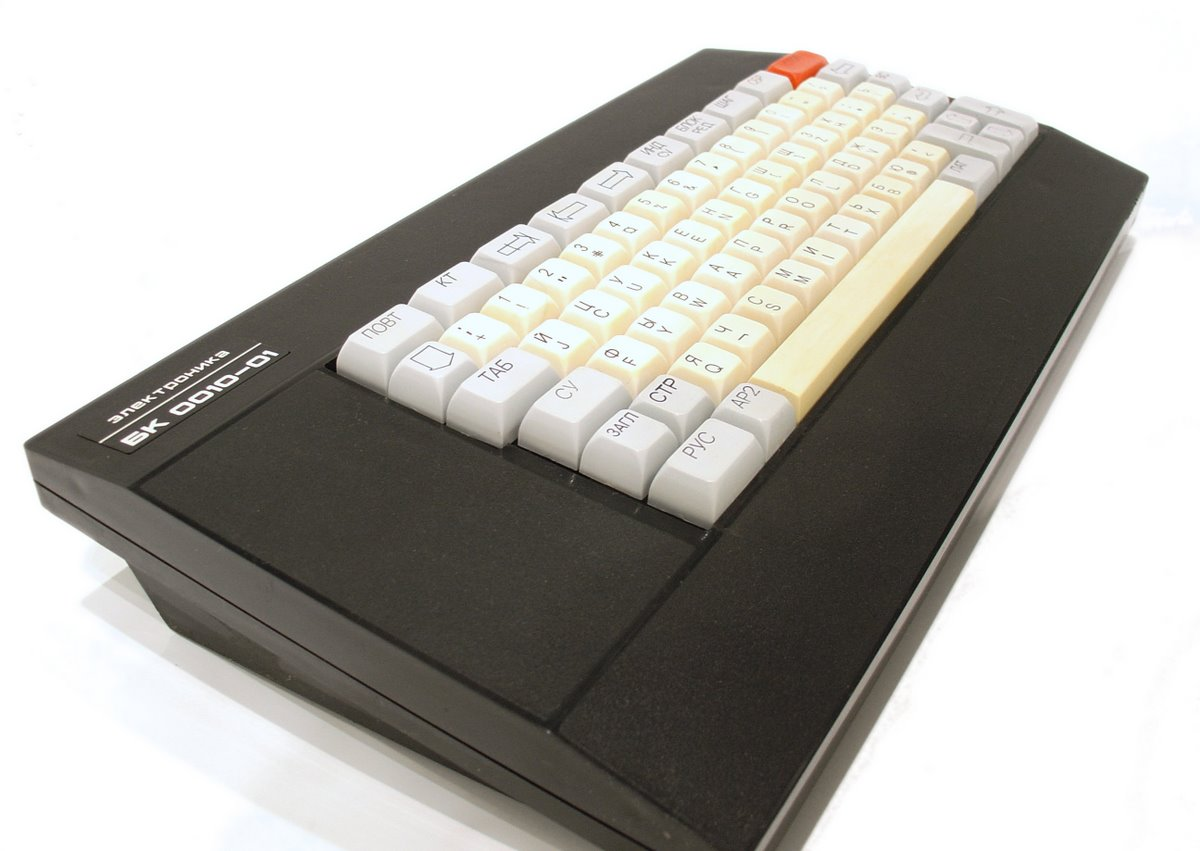
The Soviet Electronika BK0010.01 home computer was based on the К1801ВМ1 (Soviet LSI-11-compatible CPU) and was, basically, a variation of PDP-11.

Many home computers were superficially similar. Most had a keyboard integrated into the same case as the motherboard, or, more frequently, a mainboard. While the expandable home computers appeared from the very start (the Apple II offered as many as seven expansion slots), as the whole segment was generally aimed downmarket, few offers were priced or positioned high enough to allow for such expandability. Some systems had only one expansion port, often realized in the form of cumbersome sidecar systems, such as on the TI-99/4, or required finicky and unwieldy ribbon cables to connect the expansion modules.

Sometimes they were equipped with a cheap membrane or chiclet keyboard in the early days, although full-travel keyboards quickly became universal due to overwhelming consumer preference. Most systems could use an RF modulator to display 20–40 column text output on a home television. Indeed, the use of a television set as a display almost defines the pre-PC home computer. Although dedicated composite or "green screen" computer displays were available for this market segment and offered a sharper display, a monitor was often a later purchase made only after users had bought a floppy disk drive, printer, modem, and the other pieces of a full system. The reason for this was that while those TV-monitors had difficulty displaying the clear and readable 80-column text that became the industry standard at the time, the only consumers who really needed that were the power users utilizing the machine for business purposes, while the average casual consumer would use the system for games only and was content with the lower resolution, for which a TV worked fine. An important exception was the Radio Shack TRS-80, the first mass-marketed computer for home use, which included its own 64-column display monitor and full-travel keyboard as standard features.

This "peripherals sold separately" approach is another defining characteristic of the home computer era. A first-time computer buyer who brought a base C-64 system home and hooked it up to their TV would find they needed to buy a disk drive (the Commodore 1541 was the only fully-compatible model) or Datasette before they could make use of it as anything but a game machine or TV Typewriter.

In the early part of the 1980s, the dominant microprocessors used in home computers were the 8-bit MOS Technology 6502 (Apple, Commodore, Atari, BBC Micro) and Zilog Z80 (TRS-80, ZX81, ZX Spectrum, Commodore 128, Amstrad CPC). One exception was the TI-99/4, announced in 1979 with a 16-bit TMS9900 CPU. The TI was originally to use the 8-bit 9985 processor designed especially for it, but this project was cancelled. However, the glue logic needed to retrofit the 16-bit CPU to an 8-bit 9985 system negated the advantages of the more powerful CPU. Another exception was the Soviet Elektronika BK series of 1984, which used the fully-16-bit and powerful for the time 1801 series CPU, offering a full PDP-11 compatibility and a fully functional Q-Bus slot, though at the cost of very anemic RAM and graphics. The Motorola 6809 was used by the Radio Shack TRS-80 Color Computer, the Fujitsu FM-7, and Dragon 32/64.

Processor clock rates were typically 1–2 MHz for 6502 and 6809-based CPUs and 2–4 MHz for Z80-based systems (yielding roughly equal performance), but this aspect was not emphasized by users or manufacturers, as the systems' limited RAM capacity, graphics abilities, and storage options had a more perceivable effect on performance than CPU speed. For low-price computers, the cost of RAM chips contributed greatly to the final product price to the consumer, and fast CPUs demanded expensive, fast memory. As a result, designers kept clock rates only adequate. In some cases, like the Atari and Commodore 8-bit machines, coprocessors were added to speed processing of graphics and audio data. For these computers, clock rate was considered a technical detail of interest only to users needing accurate timing for their own programs. To economize on component cost, often the same crystal used to produce color television-compatible signals was also divided down and used for the processor clock. This meant processors rarely operated at their full rated speed, and had the side-effect that European and North American versions of the same home computer operated at slightly different speeds and different video resolution due to different television standards.

Initially, many home computers used the then-ubiquitous compact audio cassette as a storage mechanism. A rough analogy to how this worked would be to place a recorder on the phone line as a file was uploaded by modem to "save" it, and playing the recording back through the modem to "load". Most cassette implementations were notoriously slow and unreliable, but 8-inch drives were too bulky for home use, and early 5.25-inch form-factor drives were priced for business use, out of reach of most home buyers. An innovative alternative was the Exatron Stringy Floppy, a continuous-loop tape drive which was much faster than a data cassette drive and could perform much like a floppy disk drive. It was available for the TRS-80 and some others. A closely related technology was the ZX Microdrive, developed by Sinclair Research in the UK, for their ZX Spectrum and QL home computers.

Eventually, mass production of 5.25-inch drives resulted in lower prices, and after about 1984, they pushed cassette drives out of the US home computer market. In other markets, such as the UK, the purchasing power of home computer customers was significantly less, leaving disk-based systems from American manufacturers such as Commodore and Apple unaffordable and in the realm of low-end business systems. 5.25-inch floppy disk drives would remain standard until the end of the 8-bit era. Though external 3.5-inch drives were made available for home computer systems during the second half of the 1980s, almost all software sold for 8-bit home computers remained on 5.25-inch disks. 3.5-inch drives were used for data storage, with the exception of the Japanese MSX standard, on which 5.25-inch floppies were never popular. Standardization of disk formats was not common; sometimes, even different models from the same manufacturer used different disk formats. Almost universally, the floppy disk drives available for 8-bit home computers were housed in external cases, with their own controller boards and power supplies contained within. Only the later, advanced 8-bit home computers housed their drives within the main unit; these included the TRS-80 Model III, TRS-80 Model 4, Apple IIc, MSX2, and Commodore 128D. The later 16-bit machines, such as the Atari 1040ST (not the 520ST), Amiga, and Tandy 1000, did house floppy drive(s) internally. At any rate, to expand any computer with additional floppy drives, external units would have to be plugged in.

Toward the end of the home computer era, drives for a number of home computer models appeared, offering disk-format compatibility with the IBM PC. The disk drives sold with the Commodore 128, Amiga, and Atari ST were all able to read and write PC disks, which themselves were undergoing the transition from 5.25- to 3.5-inch format at the time (though 5.25-inch drives remained common on PCs until the late 1990s, due to the existence of the large software and data archives on five-inch floppies). 5.25-inch drives were made available for the ST, Amiga, and Macintosh; otherwise, 3.5-inch-based systems had no other use for a 5.25-inch format. Hard drives were never popular on home computers, remaining an expensive, niche product mainly for BBS sysops and the few business users.

Various copy protection schemes were developed for floppy disks; most were broken in short order. Many users would only tolerate copy protection for games, as wear and tear on disks was a significant issue in an entirely floppy-based system. The ability to make a "working backup" disk of vital application software was seen as important. Copy programs that advertised their ability to copy or even remove common protection schemes were a common category of utility software in this pre-DMCA era.

In another defining characteristic of the home computer, instead of a command line, the BASIC interpreter served double duty as a user interface. Coupled to a character-based screen or line editor, BASIC's file management commands could be entered in direct mode. In contrast to modern computers, home computers most often had their operating system (OS) stored in ROM chips. This made startup times very fast (no more than a few seconds), but made OS upgrades difficult or impossible without buying a new unit. Usually, only the most severe bugs were fixed by issuing new ROMs to replace the old ones at the user's cost. In addition, the small size and limited scope of home computer "operating systems" (really little more than what today would be called a kernel) left little room for bugs to hide.

Although modern operating systems include extensive programming libraries to ease development and promote standardization, home computer operating systems provided little support to application programs. Professionally-written software often switched out the ROM-based OS anyway to free the address space it occupied and maximize RAM capacity. This gave the program full control of the hardware and allowed the programmer to optimize performance for a specific task. Games would often turn off unused I/O ports, as well as the interrupts that served them. As multitasking was never common on home computers, this practice went largely unnoticed by users. Most software even lacked an exit command, requiring a reboot to use the system for something else.

In an enduring reflection of their early cassette-oriented nature, most home computers loaded their disk operating system (DOS) separately from the main OS. The DOS was only used for disk and file-related commands and was not required to perform other computing functions. One exception was Commodore DOS, which was not loaded into the computer's main memory at all – Commodore disk drives contained a 6502 processor and ran DOS from internal ROM. While this gave Commodore systems some advanced capabilities – a utility program could sideload a disk copy routine onto the drive and return control to the user while the drive copied the disk on its own – it also made Commodore drives more expensive and difficult to clone.

Many home computers had a cartridge interface which accepted ROM-based software. This was also used for expansion or upgrades such as fast loaders. Application software on cartridge did exist, which loaded instantly and eliminated the need for disk swapping on single-drive setups, but the vast majority of cartridges were games.

=== PCs at home ===
From the introduction of the IBM Personal Computer (ubiquitously known as the PC) in 1981, the market for computers meant for the corporate, business, and government sectors came to be dominated by the new machine and its MS-DOS operating system. Even basic PCs cost thousands of dollars and were far out of reach for typical home computer users. However, in the following years, technological advances and improved manufacturing capabilities (mainly greater use of robotics and relocation of production plants to lower-wage locations in Asia) permitted several computer companies to offer lower-cost, PC-style machines that would become competitive with many 8-bit home-market pioneers like Radio Shack, Commodore, Atari, Texas Instruments, and Sinclair. PCs could never become as affordable as these because the same price-reducing measures were available to all computer makers. Furthermore, software and peripherals for PC-style computers tended to cost more than those for 8-bit computers because of the anchoring effect caused by the pricey IBM PC. As well, PCs were inherently more expensive since they could not use the home TV set as a video display. Nonetheless, the overall reduction in manufacturing costs narrowed the price difference between old 8-bit technology and new PCs. Despite their higher absolute prices, PCs were perceived by many to be better values for their utility as superior productivity tools and their access to industry-standard software. Another advantage was the 8088/8086's wide, 20-bit address bus. The PC could access more than 64 kilobytes of memory relatively inexpensively (8-bit CPUs, which generally had multiplexed 16-bit address buses, required complicated, tricky memory management techniques like bank-switching). Similarly, the default PC floppy was double-sided, with about twice the storage capacity of floppy disks used by 8-bit home computers. PC drives tended to cost less because they were most often built-in, requiring no external case, controller, or power supply. The faster clock rates and wider buses available to later Intel CPUs compensated somewhat for the custom graphics and sound chips of the Commodores and Ataris. In time, the growing popularity of home PCs spurred many software publishers to offer gaming and children's software titles.

Many decision-makers in the computer industry believed there could be a viable market for office workers who used PC/DOS computers at their jobs and would appreciate an ability to bring diskettes of data home on weeknights and weekends to continue work after hours on their "home" computers. So, the ability to run industry-standard MS-DOS software on affordable, user-friendly PCs was anticipated as a source of new sales. Furthermore, many in the industry felt that MS-DOS would eventually (inevitably, it seemed) come to dominate the computer business entirely, and some manufacturers felt the need to offer individual customers PC-style products suitable for the home market.

In early 1984, market colossus IBM produced the PCjr as a PC/DOS-compatible machine aimed squarely at the home user. It proved a spectacular failure because IBM deliberately limited its capabilities and expansion possibilities in order to avoid cannibalizing sales of the profitable PC. IBM management believed that if they made the PCjr too powerful, too many buyers would prefer it over the bigger, more expensive PC. Poor reviews in the computer press and poor sales doomed the PCjr.

Tandy Corporation capitalized on IBM's blunder with its PCjr-compatible Tandy 1000 in November. Like the PCjr, it was pitched as a home, education, and small-business computer, featuring joystick ports, better sound and graphics (same as the PCjr but with enhancements), combined with near-PC/DOS compatibility (unlike Tandy's earlier Tandy 2000). The improved Tandy 1000 video hardware became a standard of its own, known as Tandy Graphics Adapter or TGA. Later, Tandy produced Tandy 1000 variants in form factors and price-points even more suited to the home computer market, comprised particularly by the Tandy 1000 EX and HX models (later supplanted by the 1000 RL), which came in cases resembling the original Apple IIs (CPU, keyboard, expansion slots, and power supply in a slimline cabinet) but also included floppy disk drives. The proprietary Deskmate productivity suite came bundled with the Tandy 1000s. Deskmate was suited to use by computer novices with its point-and-click (though not graphical) user interface. From the launch of the Tandy 1000 series, their manufacture were price-competitive because of Tandy's use of high-density ASIC chip technology, which allowed their engineers to integrate many hardware features into the motherboard (obviating the need for circuit cards in expansion slots as with other brands of PC). Tandy never transferred its manufacturing operation to Asia; all Tandy desktop computers were built in the USA (this was not true of the laptop and pocket computers, nor of peripherals).

In 1985, the Epson corporation, a popular and respected producer of inexpensive dot-matrix printers and business computers (the QX-10 and QX-16), introduced its low-cost Epson Equity PC. Its designers took minor shortcuts, such as few expansion slots and a lack of a socket for an 8087 math chip, but Epson did bundle some utility programs that offered decent turnkey functionality for novice users. While not a high performer, the Equity was a reliable and compatible design for half the price of a similarly configured IBM PC. Epson often promoted sales by bundling one of its printers with it at cost. The Equity I sold well enough to warrant the furtherance of the Equity line with the follow-on Equity II and Equity III.

In 1986, UK home computer maker Amstrad began producing their PC1512 PC-compatible for sale in the UK. Later, they would market the machine in the US as the PC6400. In June 1987, an improved model was produced as the PC1640. These machines had fast 8086 CPUs, enhanced CGA graphics, and were feature-laden for their modest prices. They had joystick adapters built into their keyboards and shipped with a licensed version of Digital Research's GEM, a GUI for the MS-DOS operating system. They became marginal successes in the home market.

In 1987, longtime small computer maker Zenith introduced a low-cost PC they called the EaZy PC. This was positioned as an "appliance" computer much like the original Apple Macintosh: turnkey startup, built-in monochrome video monitor, and lacking expansion slots, requiring proprietary add-ons available only from Zenith, but instead with the traditional MS-DOS Command-line interface. The EaZy PC used a turbo NEC V40 CPU (up-rated 8088), which was rather slow for its time, but the video monitor did feature 400-pixel vertical resolution. This unique computer failed for the same reasons as did IBM's PCjr: poor performance and expandability, and a price too high for the home market.

Another company that offered low-cost PCs for home use was Leading Edge, with their Model M and Model D computers. These were configured like full-featured business PCs, yet still could compete in the home market on price because Leading Edge had access to low-cost hardware from their Asian manufacturing partners Mitsubishi with the Model M and Daewoo with the Model D. The LEWP was bundled with the Model D. It was favorably reviewed by the computer press and sold very well.

By the mid '80s, the market for inexpensive PCs for use in the home market was expanding at such a rate that the two leaders in the US, Commodore and Atari, themselves felt compelled to enter the market with their own lines. They were only marginally successful compared to other companies that made only PCs.

Still, later prices of white box PC clone computers by various manufacturers became competitive with the higher-end home computers (see below). Throughout the 1980s, costs and prices continued to be driven down by: advanced circuit design and manufacturing, multi-function expansion cards, shareware applications such as PC-Talk, PC-Write, and PC-File, greater hardware reliability, and more user-friendly software that demanded less customer support services. The increasing availability of faster processors and memory chips, inexpensive EGA and VGA video cards, sound cards, and joystick adapters also bolstered the viability of PC/DOS computers as alternatives to specially made computers and game consoles for the home.

=== High performance ===
From about 1985, the high end of the home computer market began to be dominated by "next-generation" home computers using the 16-bit Motorola 68000 chip, which enabled the greatly increased abilities of the Amiga and Atari ST series (in the UK, the Sinclair QL was built around the Motorola 68008 with its external 8-bit bus). Graphics resolutions approximately doubled to give roughly NTSC-class resolution, and color palettes increased from dozens to hundreds or thousands of colors available. The Amiga was built with a custom chipset with dedicated graphics and sound coprocessors for high-performance video and audio. The Amiga found use as a workstation for desktop video, a first for a stand-alone computer, costing far less than dedicated motion-video processing equipment, costing many thousands of dollars. Stereo sound became standard for the first time; the Amiga has stereo sound, then Acorn Archimedes, and later Atari STe; the earlier Atari ST gained popularity as an affordable alternative for MIDI equipment for the production of music (MIDI supports stereo for all computers, not just the Atari ST that made it popular, MIDI is also possible to use with the Amiga).

Clock rates on the 68000-based systems were approximately 8 MHz with RAM capacities of 256 kB (for the base Amiga 1000) up to 1024 KB (1 MB, a milestone, first seen on the Atari 1040ST). These systems used 3.5-inch floppy disks from the beginning, but 5.25-inch drives were made available to facilitate data exchange with IBM PC compatibles. The Amiga and ST both had GUIs with windowing technology. These were inspired by the Macintosh, but at a list price of US$2,495 (equivalent to $7,500 in 2025), the Macintosh itself was too expensive for most households. The Amiga in particular had true multitasking capability, and unlike all other low-cost computers of the era, could run multiple applications in their own windows.

The second generation of MSX computers (MSX2) achieved the performance of high-performance computers using a high-speed video processor (Yamaha V9938) capable of handling resolutions of 512 × 424 pixels, and 256 simultaneous colors from a palette of 512.

=== MSX ===
MSX was a standard for a home computing architecture that was intended and hoped to become a universal platform for home computing. It was conceived, engineered and marketed by Microsoft Japan with ASCII Corporation. Computers conforming to the MSX standard were produced by most all major Japanese electronics manufacturers, as well as two Korean ones and several others in Europe and South America. Some 5 million units are known to have been sold in Japan alone. They sold in smaller numbers throughout the world. Due to the "price wars" being waged in the USA home computer market during the 1983-85 period, MSX computers were never marketed to any great extent in the USA. Eventually, more advanced mainstream home computers and game consoles obsoleted the MSX machines.

The MSX computers were built around the Zilog Z80 8-bit processor, assisted with dedicated video graphics and audio coprocessors supplied by Intel, Texas Instruments, and General Instrument. MSX computers received a great deal of software support from the traditional Japanese publishers of game software. Microsoft developed the MSX-DOS operating system, a version of their popular MS-DOS adapted to the architecture of these machines, which was also able to run CP/M software directly

== Radio frequency interference ==
After the first wave of game consoles and computers landed in American homes, the United States Federal Communications Commission (FCC) began receiving complaints of electromagnetic interference to television reception. By 1979, the FCC demanded that home computer makers submit samples for radio frequency interference testing. It was found that first-generation home computers emitted too much radio frequency noise for household use. The Atari 400 and 800 were designed with heavy RF shielding to meet the new requirements. Between 1980 and 1982, regulations governing RF emittance from home computers were phased in. Some companies appealed to the FCC to waive the requirements for home computers, while others (with compliant designs) objected to the waiver. Eventually, techniques to suppress interference became standardized.

== Reception and sociological impact ==
In 1977, referring to computers used in home automation at the dawn of the home computer era, Digital Equipment Corporation CEO Ken Olsen is quoted as saying, "There is no reason for any individual to have a computer in his home." Despite Olsen's warning, in the late 1970s and early 1980s, from about 1977 to 1983, it was widely predicted that computers would soon revolutionize many aspects of home and family life as they had business practices in the previous decades. Mothers would keep their recipe catalog in "kitchen computer" databases and turn to a medical database for help with child care, fathers would use the family's computer to manage family finances and track automobile maintenance. Children would use online encyclopedias for school work and would be avid video gamers. The computer would even be tasked with babysitting younger children. Home automation would bring about the intelligent home of the 1980s. Using Videotex, NAPLPS or some sort of vaguely conceptualized computer technology, television would gain interactivity. It would be possible to do the week's grocery shopping through the television. The "personalized newspaper" (to be displayed on the television screen) was another commonly predicted application. Morning coffee would be brewed automatically under computer control. The same household computer would control the home's lighting and temperature. Robots would take the garbage out, and be programmed to perform new tasks via the home computer. Electronics were expensive, so it was generally assumed that each home would have only one computer for the entire family to use. Home control would be performed in a multitasking time-sharing arrangement, with interfaces to the various devices it was expected to control.

When the computer revolution was unofficially announced in the early 1980s, all indications were that it would change the world. Experts predicted that within five years, every household would have a computer. Dad would run his business on it. Mom would store her recipes on it. The kids would do their homework on it. Today only 15% of American homes have a computer – and the other 85% don't seem the least bit interested. There is a general feeling that the home computer was a fad and that there is really no practical purpose for a computer in the home.

— Commodore Magazine, September 1987

All this was predicted to be commonplace by the end of the 1980s, but by 1987, Dan Gutman wrote that the predicted revolution was "in shambles", with only 15% of American homes owning a computer. Virtually every aspect that was foreseen would be delayed to later years or would be entirely surpassed by later technological developments. The home computers of the early 1980s could not multitask, which meant that using one as a home automation or entertainment appliance would require it be kept powered on at all times and dedicated exclusively for this use. Even if the computers could be used for multiple purposes simultaneously as today, other technical limitations predominated; memory capacities were too small to hold entire encyclopedias or databases of financial records; floppy disk-based storage was inadequate in both capacity and speed for multimedia work; and the home computers' graphics chips could only display blocky, unrealistic images and blurry, jagged text that would be difficult to read a newspaper from. Although CD-ROM technology was introduced in 1985 with much promise for its future use, the drives were prohibitively expensive and only interfaced with IBM PCs and compatibles.

The Boston Phoenix stated in 1983 that "people are catching on to the fact that 'applications' like balancing your checkbook and filing kitchen recipes are actually faster and easier to do with a pocket calculator and a box of index cards". inCider observed that "companies cannot live by dilettantes alone". Gutman wrote that when the first computer boom ended in 1984, "Suddenly, everybody was saying that the home computer was a fad, just another hula hoop". Robert Lydon, publisher of Personal Computing, stated in 1985 that the home market "never really existed. It was a fad. Just about everyone who was going to buy a computer for their home has done it", and predicted that Apple would cease to exist within two years.

A backlash set in; computer users were geeks, nerds or worse, hackers. The video game crash of 1983 soured many on home computer technology as users saw large investments in 'the technology of the future' turn into dead ends when manufacturers pulled out of the market or went out of business. The computers that were bought for use in the family room were either forgotten in closets or relegated to basements and children's bedrooms to be used exclusively for games and the occasional book report. Home computers of the 1980s have been called "a technology in search of a use". In 1984 Tandy executive Steve Leininger, designer of the TRS-80 Model I, admitted that "As an industry we haven't found any compelling reason to buy a computer for the home" other than for word processing. A 1985 study found that, during a typical week, 40% of adult computer owners did not use their computers at all. Usage rates among children were higher, with households reporting that only 16-20% of children aged 6––17 did not use the computer during a typical week.

It would take another 10 years for technology to mature, for the graphical user interface to make the computer approachable for non-technical users, and for the World Wide Web to provide a compelling reason for most people to want a computer in their homes. Separate 1998 studies found that 75% of Americans with Internet access accessed primarily from home and that not having Internet access at home inhibited Internet use. While computers did enter the home in the '90s, and were commonly called "personal" or "home" computers, machines commonly used in the home during this decade were large desktops, often shared amongst all members of a family through usage of multiple user accounts.

It wouldn't be until the 2000s and 2010s that many of the dreams of the home computer revolution were fully realized, though often in unanticipated ways. The cost of computer systems dropped precipitously, allowing individuals to access their own personal computing hardware, with shared desktop machines leaving the home during the 2010s. With better network connectivity and speed, resources such as encyclopedias, recipe catalogs and medical databases moved online and are now accessed over the Internet, with local storage solutions like floppy disks and CD-ROMs falling out of use for these purposes during those decades. Television never gained substantial interactivity on its own; newer forms of interactive media consumption, such as live streaming and on-demand content, instead evolved from Internet video platforms and gradually replaced traditional broadcasting models. As of the 2020s, interactive media consumption is done on screens of all sizes, with the traditional television only largely replaced by the smart TV, an Internet-connected computer with the form factor of a traditional television set, in the later 2010s, after the technologies had matured. The promises of home automation were realized by small embedded devices, not home computers, and the dream of user-controlled, interactive home automation was only realized in the 2010s as these embedded devices began to be connected to externally managed cloud servers over the Internet. Throughout the 2000s, robots such as Roomba and Aibo began to make inroads into the home, but remained a niche product throughout the 2010s, limited largely to tasks such as cleaning.

This delay was not out of keeping with other technologies newly introduced to an unprepared public. Early motorists were widely derided with the cry of "Get a horse!" until the automobile was accepted. Television languished in research labs for decades before regular public broadcasts began. In an example of changing applications for technology, before the invention of radio, the telephone was used to distribute opera and news reports, whose subscribers were denounced as "illiterate, blind, bedridden and incurably lazy people". Likewise, the acceptance of computers into daily life today is a product of continuing refinement of both technology and perception.

== Use in the 21st century ==
Retrocomputing is the use of vintage hardware, possibly performing modern tasks such as surfing the web and email. As programming techniques evolved and these systems were well-understood after decades of use, it became possible to write software giving home computers capabilities undreamed of by their designers. The Contiki OS implements a GUI and TCP/IP stack on the Apple II, Commodore 8-bit and Atari ST (16-bit) platforms, allowing these home computers to function as both internet clients and servers.

The Commodore 64 has been repackaged as the C-One and C64 Direct-to-TV, both designed by Jeri Ellsworth with modern enhancements.

Throughout the 1990s and first decade of the 21st century, many home computer systems were available inexpensively at garage sales and on eBay. Many enthusiasts started to collect home computers, with older and rarer systems being much sought after. Sometimes the collections turned into a virtual museum presented on websites.

As their often-inexpensively manufactured hardware ages and the supply of replacement parts dwindles, it has become popular among enthusiasts to emulate these machines, recreating their software environments on modern computers. One of the more well-known emulators is the Multi Emulator Super System (MESS), which can emulate most of the better-known home computers. A more or less complete list of home computer emulators can be found in the List of computer system emulators article. Games for many 8- and 16-bit home computers became available for the Wii Virtual Console.

== Notable home computers ==
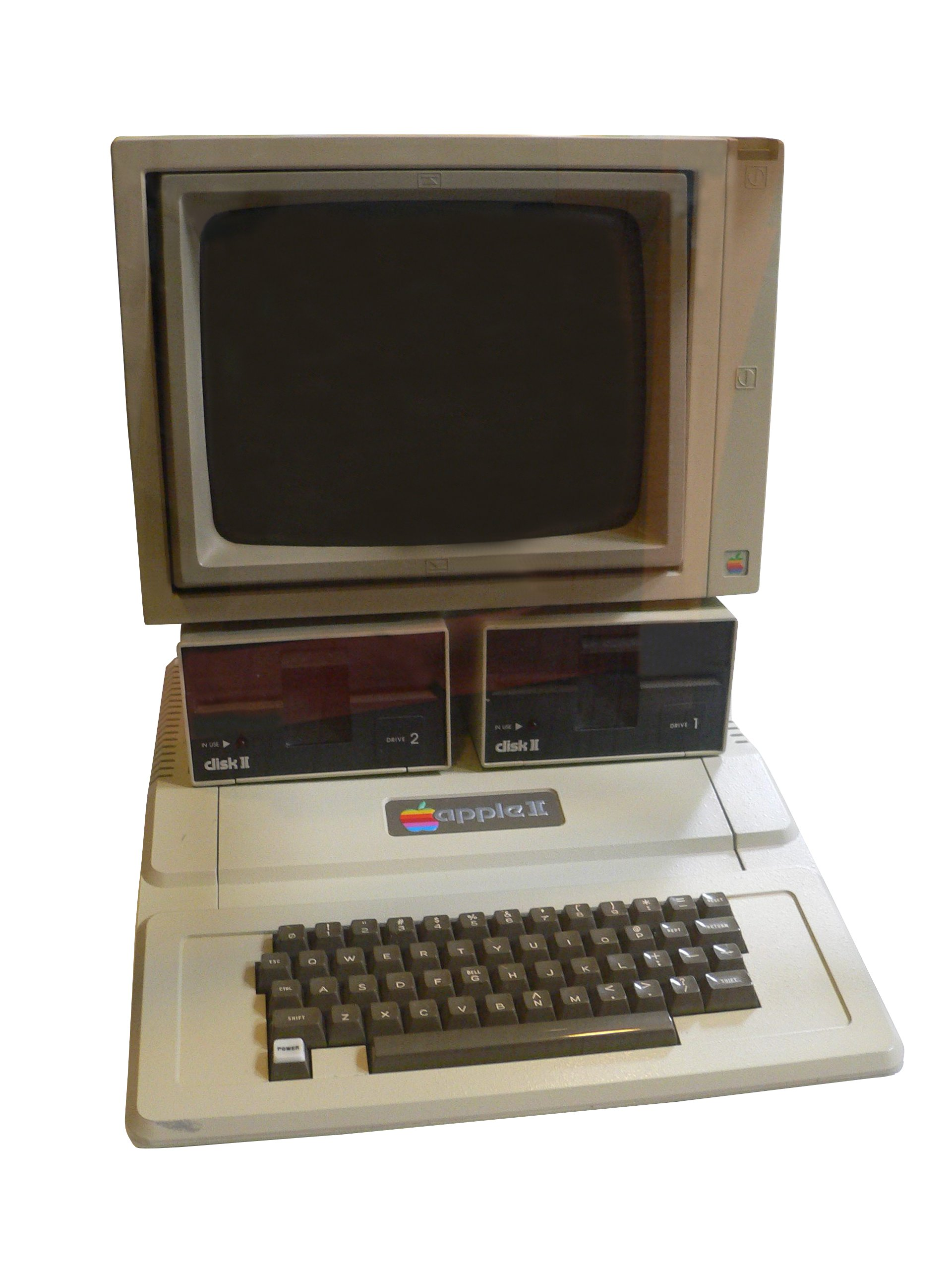
The 1977 Apple II with two Disk II disk drives and an Apple monitor

The timeline below describes many of the most popular or significant home computers of the late 1970s and of the 1980s.

The most popular home computers in the USA up to 1985 were: the TRS-80 (1977), various models of the Apple II (first introduced in 1977), the Atari 400/800 (1979) and its follow-up models, the VIC-20 (1980), and the Commodore 64 (1982). The VIC-20 was the first computer of any type to sell over one million units. At one point in 1983, Commodore was selling as many 64s as the rest of the industry's computers combined.

The British market was different, as relatively high prices and lower disposable incomes reduced the appeal of most American products. New Scientist stated in 1977 that "the price of an American kit in dollars rapidly translates into the same figure in pounds sterling by the time it has reached the shores of Britain". The Commodore 64 was also popular, but a BYTE columnist stated in 1985:

It's not easy for a U.K. citizen to write about home computers for an American magazine. We use the term to refer to an altogether different object on our side of the Atlantic.

In the U.S.A., an Apple II is a home computer; the IBM PC in its smaller configurations is a home computer; the Macintosh is a home computer. Home computers use floppy disks for mass storage and perform useful functions like word processing and income tax preparation as well as playing games.

In the U.K., those computers would be considered rather expensive as business computers, let alone for home use. Home computers typically cost less than £200 (about $250) and use cassette tape recorders for mass storage. We have various manufacturers of our own, some unheard of in the U.S.A. ... Even when we do have machines in common (the Commodore 64), I suspect that the vast majority of U.S. users buy the disk drive, while the majority of U.K. users have only the cassette deck.

Many of the British-made systems like Sinclair's ZX81 and ZX Spectrum, and later the Amstrad/Schneider CPC were much more widely used in Europe than US systems. A few low-cost British Sinclair models were sold in the US by Timex Corporation as the Timex Sinclair 1000 and the ill-fated Timex Sinclair 2068, but neither established a strong following. The only transatlantic success was the Commodore 64, which competed favorably price-wise with the British systems, and was the most popular system in Europe as in the USA.

Until the introduction of the IBM PC in 1981, computers such as the Apple II and TRS-80 also found considerable use in office work. In 1983, IBM introduced the PCjr in an attempt to continue their business computer success in the home computer market, but incompatibilities between it and the standard PC kept users away. Assisted by a large public domain software library and promotional offers from Commodore, the PET had a sizable presence in the North American education market until that segment was largely ceded to the Apple II as Commodore focused on the C-64's success in the mass retail market.

=== 1970s ===
The following microcomputers were precursors to the home computers. They were not called home computers yet, despite being that. Both were TV-compatible; one could carry them home and plug them into the TV.

- July 1976: Apple I, sold as a kit.
- July 1976: Sol-20, sold as a whole computer, with keyboard.

The following microcomputers were the prototypes for what would later become the home computer market segment, but when introduced, they sold as much to hobbyists and small businesses as to the home.

- January 1977: Commodore PET (N. Am.), first all-in-one computer: keyboard/screen/tape storage built into stamped sheet metal enclosure.
- June 1977: Apple II (North America), color graphics, eight expansion slots; one of the first computers to use a typewriter-like plastic case design.
- August 1977: TRS-80 (N. Am.), first home computer for less than US$600, used a dedicated monitor for US Federal Communications Commission (FCC) rules compliance.
- September 1977: Sord M200, the first Japanese home computer.
- In 1977 Compucolor II, although shipments did not start until the next year. The Compucolor II was smaller and less expensive than the first model, which was an upgrade kit for the company's color computer terminal, turning the Intecolor 8001 into the Compucolor 8001, and used the newly introduced 5.25-inch floppy disks instead of the former 8-inch models.

The following computers also introduced significant advancements to the home computer segment:

- 1979: TI-99/4, first home computer with a 16-bit processor and first to add hardware-supported sprite graphics
- 1979: Atari 8-bit computers (N. Am.), first computers with a custom chip set and programmable video chip and built-in audio output

=== 1980s ===
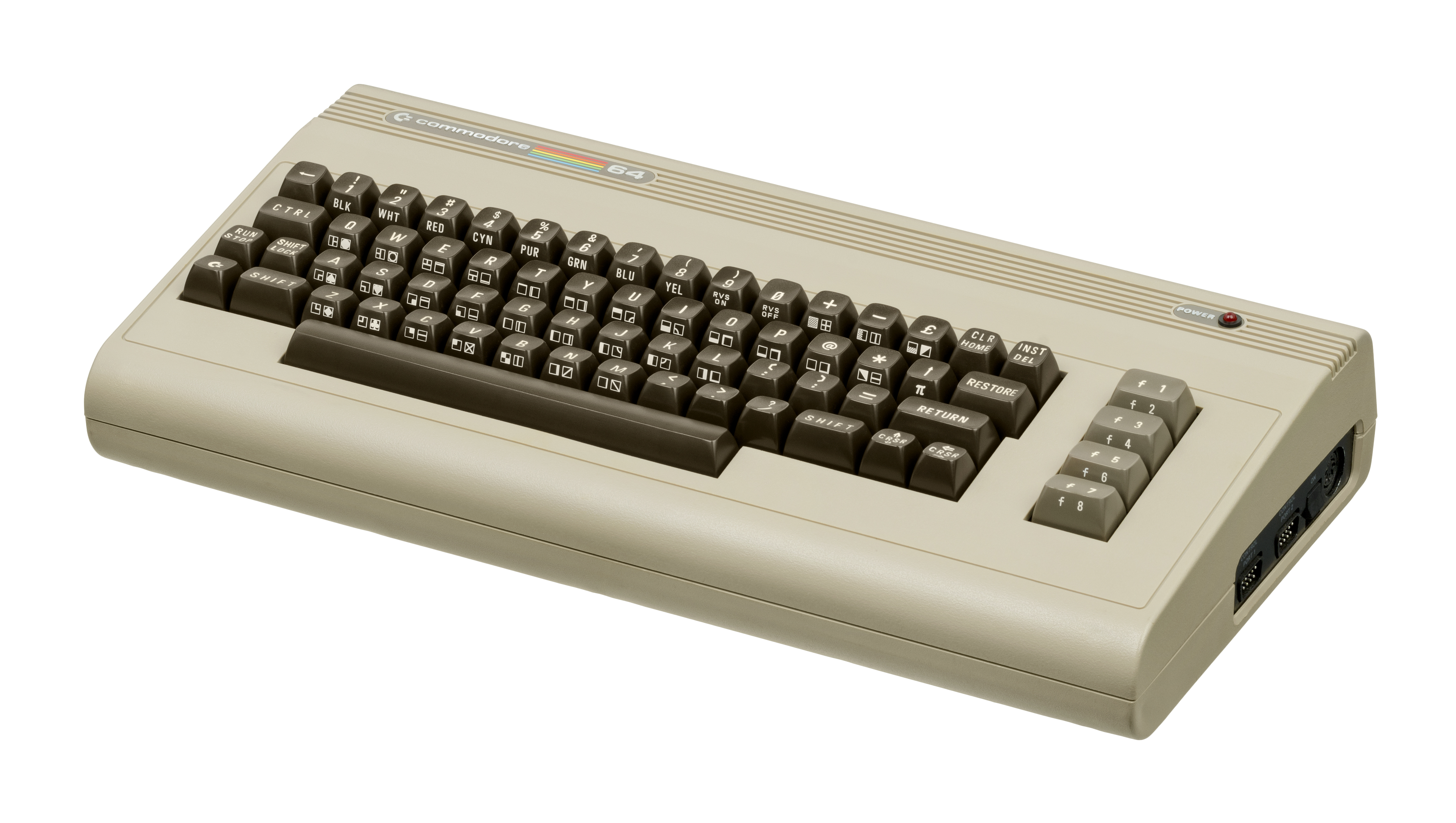
No computer has sold more units than the Commodore 64.

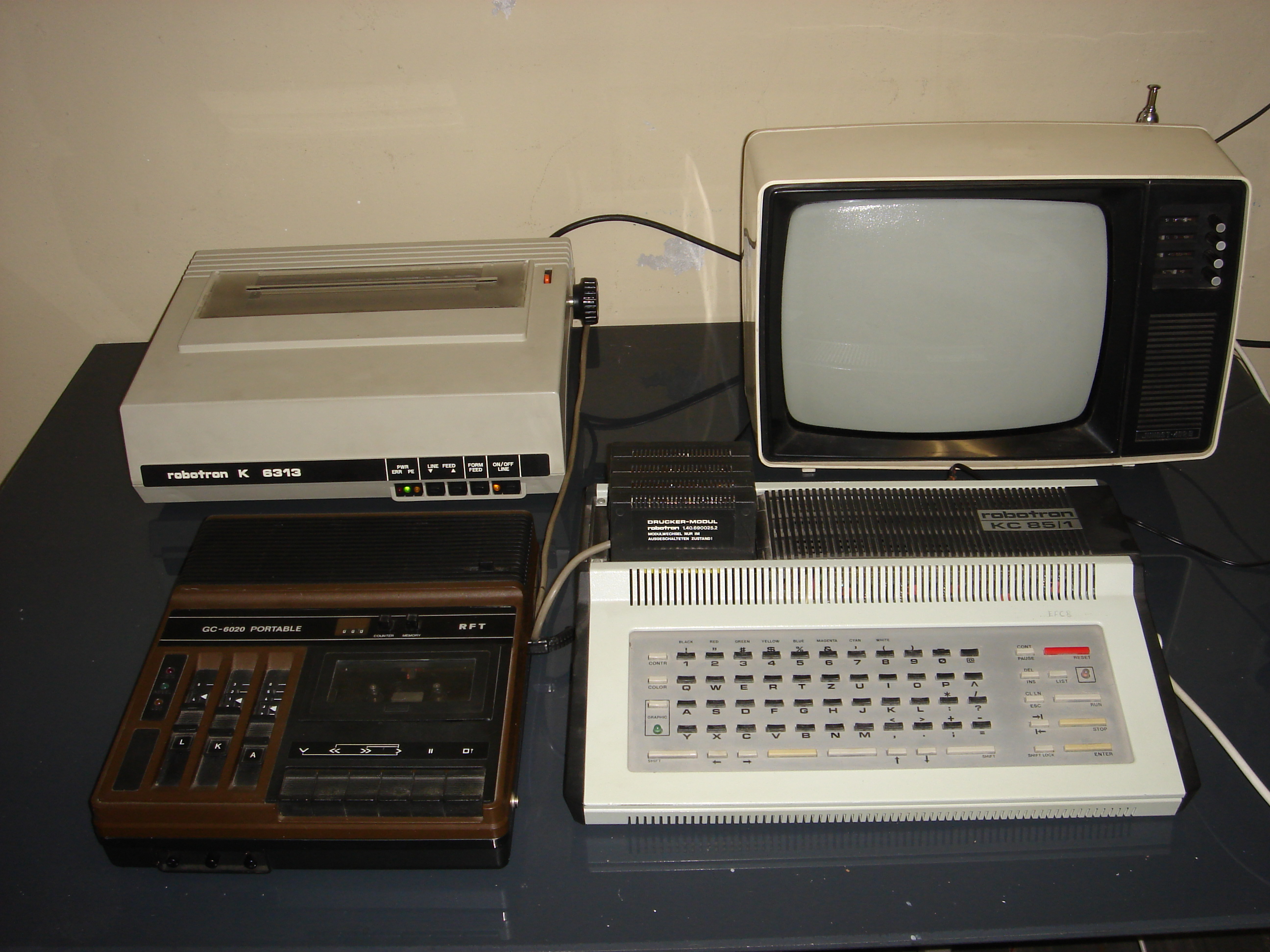
The East German Robotron KC 85/1: it featured very low production quotas and a complete lack of sales channels for private consumers.

- January 1980: Sinclair ZX80, available in the United Kingdom for less than a hundred pounds
- 1980: VIC-20 (N. Am.), under US$300; first computer of any kind to pass one million sold.
- 1980: TRS-80 Color Computer (N. Am.), Motorola 6809, optional OS-9 multi-user multi-tasking.
- July 1980: TRS-80 Model III (N. Am.), essentially a TRS-80 Model I repackaged in an all-in-one cabinet, to comply with FCC regulations for radiofrequency interference, to eliminate cable clutter, and use only one electrical outlet. Some enhancements like extended character set, repeating keys, and real-time clock.
- June 1981: TI-99/4A, based on the less successful TI-99/4.
- 1981: ZX81 (Europe), £49.95 in kit form; £69.95 pre-built, released as Timex Sinclair 1000 in US in 1982.
- 1981: BBC Micro (Europe), premier educational computer in the UK for a decade; advanced BBC BASIC with integrated 6502 machine code assembler, and a large number of I/O ports, ~ 1.5 million sold.
- April 1982: ZX Spectrum (Europe), best-selling British home computer; catalysed the UK software industry, widely cloned by the Soviet Union.
- June 1982: MicroBee (Australia), initially as a kit, then as a finished unit.
- August 1982: Dragon 32 (UK) became, for a short time, the best-selling home micro in the United Kingdom.
- August 1982: Commodore 64 (N. Am.), custom graphic & synthesizer chipset, best-selling computer model of all time: ~ 17 million sold.
- Jan. 1983: Apple IIe, Apple II enhanced. Reduced component count and production costs enabled high-volume production until 1993.
- April 1983: TRS-80 Model 4, major upgrade compatible with Model III. Ran industry-standard CP/M, updated TRSDOS 6, 4 MHz speed, 128KB RAM max, 80x24 screen, 640x240 high-res option. In September, the transportable "luggable" Model 4P was unveiled.
- 1983: Acorn Electron A stripped-down sibling of the BBC microcomputer with limited functionality. The Electron recovered from a slow start to become one of the more popular home computers of that era in the UK.
- 1983: Sanyo PHC-25, with 16k of RAM, one of a number of Sanyo models
- 1983: Coleco Adam, one of the few home computers to be sold only as a complete system with storage device and printer; cousin to the ColecoVision game console.
- 1983: MSX (Japan, Korea, the Arab League, Europe, N+S. Am., USSR), a computer 'reference design' by ASCII and Microsoft, produced by several companies: ~ 5 million sold in Japan.
- 1983: VTech Laser 200, entry-level computer aimed at being the cheapest on the market, also sold as Salora Fellow, Texet TX8000 & Dick Smith VZ 200.
- 1983: Oric 1 and Oric Atmos (Europe), a home computer equipped with a full travel keyboard and an extended version of Microsoft BASIC in ROM.
- January 1984: The Macintosh is introduced, providing many consumers with their first look at a graphical user interface, which would eventually replace the home computer as it was known.
- April 1984: Apple IIc, Apple II compact. No expansion slots, and built-in ports for pseudo-plug and play ease of use. The Apple II was most geared to home use, to complement the Apple IIe's dominant education market share.
- March 1984: IBM PCjr, designed, priced and marketed as a home computer for kids and teens, but purchased mostly by business customers who wanted an inexpensive IBM compatible PC.
- 1984: Tiki 100 (Norway), Zilog Z80-based home/educational computer made by Tiki Data.
- June 1984: Amstrad/Schneider CPC, a very popular system in the UK which also sold well in Europe.
- 1985: TRS-80 Model 4D: updated Model 4 with double-sided drives and Deskmate productivity suite.
- 1985: Elektronika BK-0010, one of the first 16-bit home computers; made in USSR.
- 1985: Robotron KC 85/1 (Europe), one of the few 8-bit general-purpose microcomputers produced in East Germany. As the KC line of computers, with the exception of the KC compact, was not available for sale to the general public due to the strict prioritization of 'societal users' over consumers, they are not genuine 'home computers'.
- 1985: Atari ST (N. Am.), first with a graphical user interface (GEM) for less than US$1000; also 1 MB RAM and 16-bit Motorola 68000 processor for under US$1000.
- 1985: MSX2, the second generation of MSX computers, is launched worldwide. They achieved the performance of high-performance computers using a high-speed video processor (Yamaha V9938) capable of handling resolutions of 512x424 pixels, and 256 simultaneous colors from a palette of 512
- June 1985: Commodore 128 (N. Am.) Final, most advanced 8-bit Commodore, retained full C64 compatibility while adding CP/M in a complex multi-mode architecture
- July 1985: Amiga 1000 (N. Am.), custom chip set for graphics and digital audio; multitasking OS with both GUI and CLI interfaces; 16-bit Motorola 68000 processor. Initially designed as a game console but repositioned as a home computer.
- 1986: Apple IIGS, fifth and most advanced model in the Apple II, with greatly enhanced graphics and sound abilities. Used a 16-bit 65C816 CPU, the same as used in the Super Nintendo Entertainment System.
- June 1987: Acorn Archimedes (Europe), launched with an 8 MHz 32-bit ARM2 microprocessor, with between 512 KB and 4 MB of RAM, and an optional 20 or 40 MB hard drive.
- October 1987: Amiga 500 (N. Am.), Amiga 1000 repackaged into a C64-like housing with keyboard and motherboard in the same enclosure, along with a 3.5-inch floppy disk drive. Introduced at the same time as the more expandable Amiga 2000.
- 1988: The MSX2+ is launched in Japan. It is able to show more than 19,000 simultaneous colors on screen thanks to hardware-based graphic compression.
- 1989: SAM Coupé (Europe), based on 6 MHz Z80 microprocessor; marketed as a logical upgrade from the ZX Spectrum.

=== 1990s ===
- December 1991: The MSX TurboR is launched in Japan only. This is the last generation of MSX computers that was put to market by a household electronics brand. It is also the first MSX based on a 16-bit CPU: The Ascii R800 processor.
- 1992: Atari Falcon (N. Am.), the final home computer from Atari, shipped with a digital signal processor.
- October 1992: Amiga 1200 (N. Am.), the final home computer from Commodore, sold well in Europe.

== See also ==
- Educational toy
- Computer magazines
- History of computing hardware (1960s–present)
- History of personal computers
- Homebuilt computer
- Honeywell 6969 a "home computer" from 1969
- Keyboard computer
- Raspberry Pi
- List of home computers
- List of home computers by category
- List of home computers by video hardware
- List of video game consoles
- Influence of the IBM PC on the personal computer market
- Microprocessor development board and List of early microcomputers, first microprocessor based systems used by hobbyists
- Personal computer
- Pirates of Silicon Valley – docu-fiction focused on Apple and Microsoft evolution
- Triumph of the Nerds
- Video Display Controller, chips that were used to create the video graphics of many early home computers
