= PCPP =

PCPP can refer to:

- PC PowerPlay, Australia's only dedicated PC games magazine.
- PCPartPicker, PC-building list creator and community.
- Polychloro phenoxy phenol
- para-Chlorophenylpiperazine
