= Future-proof =

Planning and building for time to come

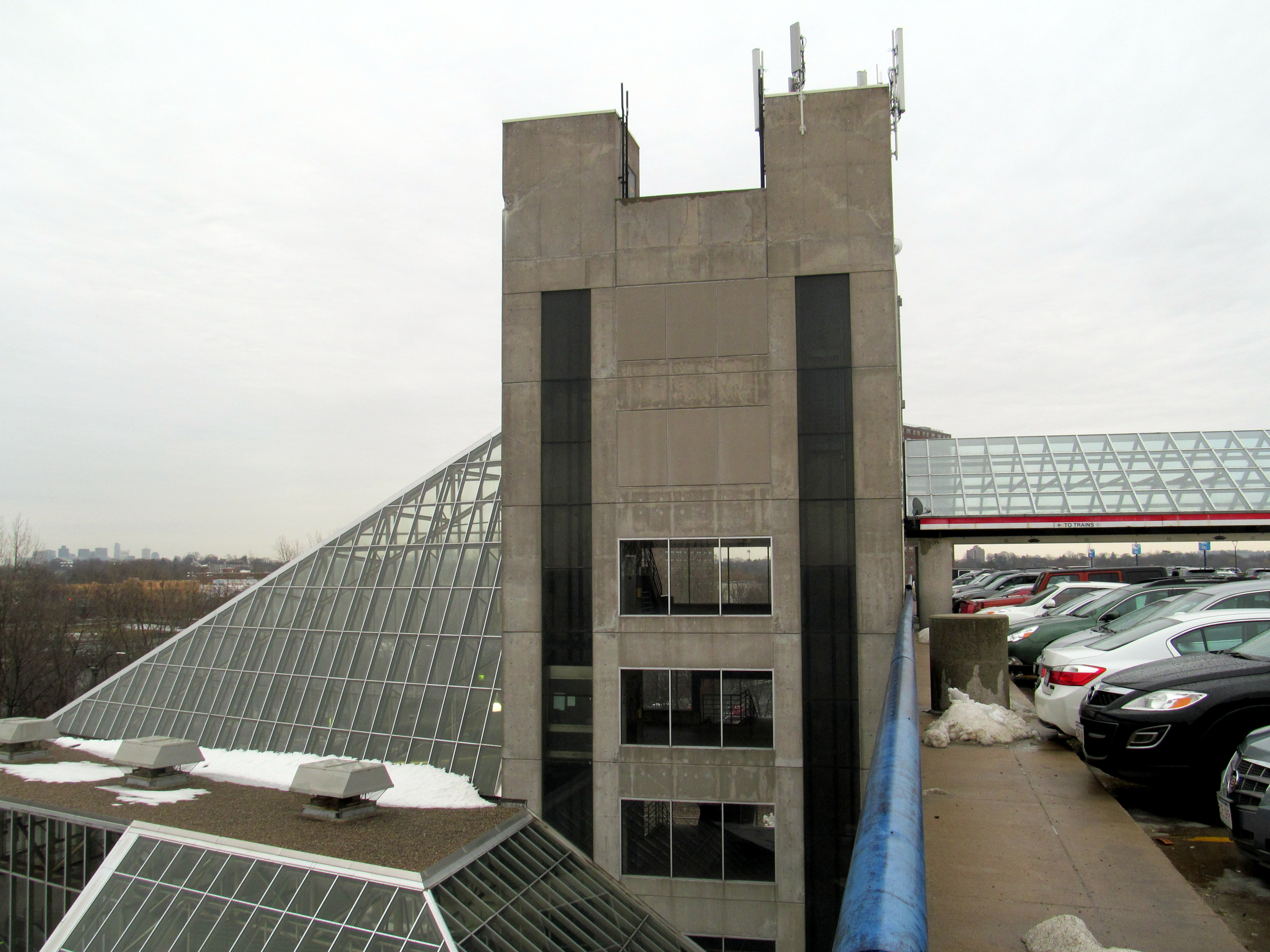
The parking garage at Alewife station was built to accommodate two additional levels if needed, with tall elevator shafts and knockout panels for future windows.

Future-proofing (also futureproofing) is the process of anticipating the future and developing methods of minimizing the effects of shocks and stresses of future events. Future-proofing is used in industries such as infrastructure development, electronics, medical industry, industrial design, law, and more recently, in design for climate change. The principles of future-proofing are extracted from other industries and codified as a system for approaching an intervention in a historic building.

== Electronics and communications ==
In future-proof electrical systems, buildings should have "flexible distribution systems to allow communication technologies to expand., Image-related processing software should be flexible, adaptable, and programmable to be able to work with several different potential media in the future as well as to handle increasing file sizes. Image-related processing software should also be scalable and embeddable – in other words, the use or place in which the software is employed is variable and the software needs to accommodate the variable environment. Higher processing integration is required to support future computational requirements in image processing as well.

In wireless phone networks, future-proofing of the network hardware and software systems deployed becomes critical because they are so costly to deploy that it is not economically viable to replace each system when changes in network operations occur. Telecommunications system designers focus heavily on the ability of a system to be reused and to be flexible in order to continue competing in the marketplace.

In 1998, teleradiology (the ability to send radiology images such as X-rays and CAT scans over the internet to a reviewing radiologist) was in its infancy. Doctors developed their own systems, aware that technology would change over time. They consciously included future-proof as one of the characteristics that their investment would need to have. To these doctors, future-proof meant open modular architecture and interoperability so that as technology advanced it would be possible to update the hardware and software modules within the system without disrupting the remaining modules. This draws out two characteristics of future-proofing that are important to the built environment: interoperability and the ability to be adapted to future technologies as they were developed.

== Industrial design ==
=== Role in shaping futures ===
The designer has a prescriptive rather than descriptive job. Unlike scientists who describe how the world is, designers suggest how it might be. Designers are therefore futurologists to some extent.

The practice builds on the work of the Italian Radicals in the 1960's, through the critical design work of Anthony Dunne and Fiona Raby in the late 1990’s, who developed design approaches for the exploration and critique of ideas, rather than for the creation of objects.

The least time it takes to produce a product and get it on the shelf is a couple of years. Designers have to deal with the future when they design things.

In industrial design, future-proofing designs seek to prevent obsolescence by analyzing the decrease in desirability of products. Desirability is measured in categories such as function, appearance, and emotional value. The products with more functional design, better appearance, and which accumulate emotional value faster tend to be retained longer and are considered future-proof. Some of the characteristics of future-proof products that come out of this study include a timeless nature, high durability, aesthetic appearances that capture and hold the interest of buyers. Ideally, as an object ages, its desirability is maintained or increases with increased emotional attachment. Products that fit into society's current paradigm of progress, while simultaneously making progress, also tend to have increased desirability.

That desire to change the world runs throughout speculative design, where success is often measured not in what’s made, but instead the impact of your idea and how it seeps into wider thinking.

=== Speculative design in practice and impact ===
At Google, various strategy and visioning teams use their creative expertise within internal studios and departments to explore what may lay beyond the horizon in five, 10, or even 15 years time. The value of speculative design is not the created product, instead the benefit is the discussion, contemplation, and understanding that it sparks.

Through a complex and iterative process of synthesis and transformation of research data, designers empathize with the future through revealing future design opportunities. These opportunities are identified through the movement from data to information, and information to insight utilizing visual mapping techniques. This movement involves various levels of abstraction

before drawing together into actionable insights.

=== Methodologies for future-oriented design ===
Product and service development involves identifying opportunities by examining current user needs and utilizing these insights in design activities.

Ideas about the future are made concrete within prototypes, and as such these ideas are explored in the present. For a fleeting moment, the future and the present coexist.

Whether predicting or shaping how the future will unfold, speculative design needs to strike a balance between what’s possible and what’s pure science fiction. Too ambitious, and your concept will likely never materialize. Too practical or conservative, and the value of speculative design is lost. As Golden Krishna puts it, “If everything that we thought of got made, then we wouldn’t be doing our job right.”（Golden Krishna, Head of Design Strategy at Google’s Platforms & Ecosystems group. ）

=== Ethical slant in future design ===
Philip Battin, a former designer on Google’s augmented reality eyewear project Glass and now lead at Seed Studio, believes that design as a practice has been commercialized to the point of misuse. Where once it was a byword for new bold landscapes, it has since been reduced to the aesthetics of business.

This evolving paradigm requires designers to not only envision future possibilities but also to deeply consider the ethical implications of their creations. The journey from concept to realization necessitates a responsible approach, where the societal, environmental, and moral consequences are weighed with every decision. By fostering a culture of thoughtful innovation, designers can ensure that their work contributes positively to the world, paving the way for advancements that are not only technologically advanced but also socially responsible and sustainable. This commitment to ethical foresight is what will define the legacy of future-oriented design.

In "Speculative Everything," Anthony Dunne and Fiona Raby define critical design and explain how their practice shifts towards speculative applications. They view conceptual design not as serving clients or market demands, but as a medium for reflection, inquiry, and critique, using design fiction to challenge hegemony and technocentrism. The authors advocate for designers to work independently from the industry, engaging in imaginative work rather than relying solely on commissions.

Poggenpohl argues that design stimulates ideas about how we can use technology in more empathetic ways.

== Utility systems ==
In one region of New Zealand, Hawke's Bay, a study was conducted to determine what would be required to future-proof the regional economy with specific reference to the water system. The study specifically sought to understand the existing and potential water demand in the region as well as how this potential demand might change with climate change and more intense land use. This information was used to develop demand estimates that would inform the improvements to the regional water system. Future-proofing thus includes forward planning for future development and increased demands on resources. The study focuses on future demands almost exclusively and does not address other components of future-proofing such as contingency plans to handle disastrous damage to the system or durability of the materials in the system.

== Climate change and energy conservation ==
In the realm of sustainable environmental issues, future-proof is used generally to describe the ability of a design to resist the impact of potential climate change due to global warming. Two characteristics describe this impact. First, "dependency on fossil fuels will be more or less completely eliminated and replaced by renewable energy sources." Second, "Society, infrastructure and the economy will be well adapted to the residual impacts of climate change."

In the design of low energy consuming dwellings, "buildings of the future should be sustainable, low-energy and able to accommodate social, technological, economic and regulatory changes, thus maximizing life cycle value." The goal is to "reduce the likelihood of a prematurely obsolete building design."

In Australia, research commissioned by the Health Infrastructure New South Wales explored "practical, cost-effective, design-related strategies for 'future-proofing' the buildings of a major Australian health department." This study concluded that "a focus on a whole life-cycle approach to the design and operation of health facilities clearly would have benefits." By designing in flexibility and adaptability of structures, one may "defer the obsolescence and consequent need for demolition and replacement of many health facilities, thereby reducing overall demand for building materials and energy."

The ability of a building's structural system to accommodate projected climate changes and whether "non-structural [behavioral] adaptations might have a great enough effect to offset any errors from... an erroneous choice of climate change projection". The essence of the discussion is whether adjustments in the occupant's behavior can future-proof the building against errors in judgment in estimates of the impacts of global climate change. There are many factors involved and the paper does not go into them in exhaustive detail. "Soft adaptations”, such as changes in behavior, can have a significant impact on the ability of a building to continue to function as the environment around it changes. Thus adaptability is an important criterion in the concept of "future-proofing" buildings. Adaptability is a theme that begins to come through in many of the other studies on future-proofing.

There are examples of sustainable technologies that can be used in existing buildings to take "advantage of up-to-date technologies in the enhancement of the energetic performance of buildings." The intent is to understand how to follow the new European Energy Standards to attain the best in energy savings. The subject speaks to historic buildings and specifically of façade renewal, focusing on energy conservation. These technologies include "improvement of thermal and acoustic performance, solar shadings, passive solar energy systems, and active solar energy systems." The main value of this study to future-proofing is not the specific technologies, but rather the concept of working with an existing façade by overlapping it rather than modifying the existing one. The employment of ventilated facades, double skin glass facades, and solar shadings take advantage of the thermal mass of existing buildings commonly found in Italy. These techniques not only work with thermal mass walls, but also protect damaged and deteriorating historic facades to varying degrees.

== Architecture, engineering and construction ==
Use of the term "future-proofing" has been uncommon in the AEC industry, especially with relation to historic buildings until recently. In 1997, the MAFF laboratories at York, England were described in an article as “future-proof” by being flexible enough to adapt to developing rather than static scientific research. The standard building envelope and MEP services provided could be tailored for each type of research to be performed. In 2009, “future-proof” was used in reference to “megatrends” that were driving education of planners in Australia. A similar term, “fatigue proofing,” was used in 2007 to describe steel cover plates in bridge construction that would not fail due to fatigue cracking. In 2012, a New Zealand-based organization outlined eight principles of future-proof buildings: smart energy use, increased health and safety, increased life cycle duration, increased quality of materials and installation, increased security, increased sound control for noise pollution, adaptable spatial design, and reduced carbon footprint.

Another approach to future-proofing suggests that only in more extensive refurbishments to a building should future-proofing be considered. Even then, the proposed time horizon for future-proofing events is 15 to 25 years. The explanation for this particular time horizon for future-proof improvements is unclear.

In the valuation of real estate, there are three traditional forms of obsolescence which affect property values: physical, functional, and aesthetic. Physical obsolescence occurs when the physical material of the property deteriorates to the point where it needs to be replaced or renovated. Functional obsolescence occurs when the property is no longer capable of serving the intended use or function. Aesthetic obsolescence occurs when fashions change, when something is no longer in style. A potential fourth form has emerged as well: sustainable obsolescence. Sustainable obsolescence proposes to be a combination of the above forms in many ways. Sustainable obsolescence occurs when a property no longer meets one or more sustainable design goals.

One reasonable approach to future-proof sustainable cities is an integrated multi-disciplinary combination of mitigation and adaptation to raise the level of resilience of the city. In the context of urban environments, resilience is less dependent on an exact understanding of the future than on tolerance of uncertainty and broad programs to absorb the stresses that this environment might face. The scale of the context is important in this view: events are viewed as regional stresses rather than local. The intent for a resilient urban environment is to keep many options open, emphasize diversity in the environment, and perform long-range planning that accounts for external systemic shocks.

== Historic buildings ==
Future-proofing of designated historic structures adds a level of complexity to the concepts of future-proofing in other industries as described above. All interventions on historic structures must comply with the Secretary's Standards for the Treatment of Historic Properties. The degree of compliance and the Standard selected may vary depending on jurisdiction, type of intervention, significance of the structure, and the nature of the intended interventions. The underlying principle is that no harm is done to the structure in the course of the intervention which would damage the structure or make it unavailable to future generations. In addition, it is important that the historic portions of the structure be able to be understood and comprehended apart from the newer interventions.

== Infrastructure projects ==
Future-proofing is also a methodology to address vulnerabilities of infrastructure systems. For example, analysis of domestic water infrastructure in the Southern California and Tijuana area completed by Rich and Gattuso in 2016 demonstrates that potential vulnerabilities include levee failures, material deterioration, and climate change. With changes in the hydrologic conditions due to climate change, there will be increased emphasis on ensuring that the water infrastructure systems continue to function after a natural hazard event where specific components or facilities in the system are compromised.

Many new potable water technologies, such as desalination, physical treatment, chemical treatment, and biological treatment systems, can help to address these vulnerabilities. Development of a future-proof infrastructure system can have longer lasting benefits. The San Diego Regional Water System has been implementing a program of infrastructure improvements to ensure plentiful water sources in the future. These include developed an emergency storage program aimed at providing a 75% service level and includes several key elements of the regional water system. The regional water authority is also in the middle of a multi-decade long project to reline the existing pipeline system to increase their service life (Water-technology.net, 2012). The region also seeks to supplement the water supply through diversification of sources of water which will support continued growth of the regional population. Priorities for development of new water sources (in order of preference) are seawater desalination, indirect potable reuse (wastewater recycling), and additional water from the Colorado River.

The strategies being employed in San Diego and Tijuana are future-proofing their potable water infrastructure systems by including seismic loops and flexible oversized systems to prevent damage in seismic events accommodate future changes in use and population growth. The San Diego Regional Water System is pursuing strategies that diversify and increase redundancy of water supplies by including metropolitan water district sources, irrigation water transfer, canal lining to prevent leakage, conservation or reduced consumption, recycled wastewater, desalination, groundwater sources, and surface water sources. Development of new water tunnels and relining water mains, branches, and canals extends the service life, and fortifies the system while reducing physical and functional obsolescence and preventing further deterioration of the system. Ongoing maintenance, diversification efforts, capacity development, and planning for future requirements will ensure an ongoing future-proof supply of water for the region.

== Life cycle analysis and life cycle assessment ==
Life-cycle assessment/analysis (LCA) can be used as an indicator of long-term impacts to the environment, and an important aspect of future-proofing our built environment, quantifying the impacts of initial construction, periodic renovation, and regular maintenance of a building over an extended time span. A study completed published in 2015 by Rich compares the impacts of gymnasiums constructed of different building materials over a 200-year period using the Athena Impact Estimator. Rich developed the phrase "First Impacts" to describe the environmental impacts of new construction from raw material extraction to occupancy of the building. When the environmental impacts of maintenance and replacement are considered with first impacts for a building, a complete picture of the environmental impacts are formed.

While choice of materials is important to initial impacts of a building or product, less durable materials lead to more frequent maintenance, operating expenses and replacement. By contrast, more durable materials may have more significant initial impacts, but those impacts will pay off in the long run by reducing maintenance, repairs, and operations expenses. Durability of all components of a building system should have equivalent service lives or allow for disassembly in order to maintain the shorter service life materials. This allows retention of materials that have longer service lives rather than disposing of them when removed to perform maintenance. Proper maintenance of a building is critical to long term service life because it prevents deterioration of less durable materials that can expose additional materials to deterioration.

== See also ==
- Backup
- Backward and forward compatibility
- Digital media
- Digital preservation
- Digital Preservation Coalition
- Product data management
- Year 2000 problem
- Year 2038 problem
- Year 10,000 problem
- Homebuilt computer
