= Classmates =

A classmate is a student who is part of the same class, in any of its meanings (a course, a lesson, a graduating year).

Classmate(s) may also refer to:

- Classmates (1914 film), a silent film produced by the Biograph Company
- Classmates (1924 film), a silent drama film starring Richard Barthelmess
- Classmates (1952 film), a Swedish film directed by Schamyl Bauman
- Classmates (2006 film), a Malayalam film
- Classmates (2007 film), a Telugu remake of the 2006 film
- Classmates (2008 film), a Japanese film
- Classmates (2015 film), a Marathi remake of the 2006 film
- Classmates (TV series), an American reality TV show that aired in 2003
- Classmates (manga), a 2006 manga series
- Classmates.com, a social networking service
- Classmate PC, a personal computer
- Classmate Stationery, an Indian brand of student stationery products

== See also ==
- alumni, former students of a particular educational institution
- Doukyusei (disambiguation), translated as classmates in Japanese
- Class (disambiguation)
- Mate (disambiguation)
