= Homebuilt computer =

Computer assembled from available components rather than purchased as a complete system

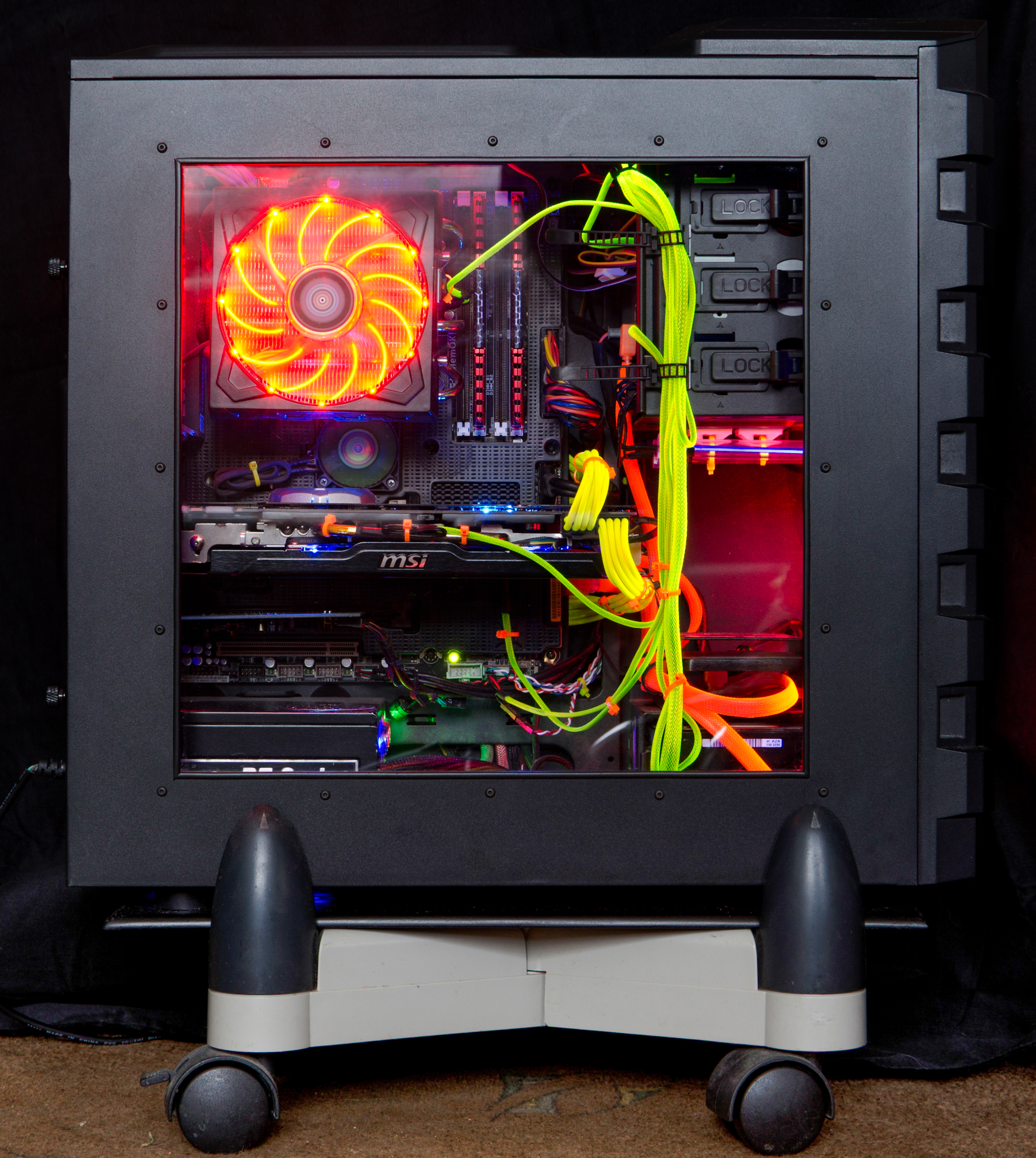
Homebuilt gaming computer

A custom built or home-built computer (Note: Commonly referred to as a rig, build, or box in the enthusiast community) is a computer assembled by its user and made of commercial off-the-shelf (COTS) components, rather than purchased as a complete and ready to use machine, also known as a "pre-built" or out-of-the-box system.

Building a computer at home is generally considered a cost-effective alternative to buying a pre-built one because it excludes the assembly labor cost. However, the total cost of building a computer can vary based on an individual's budget, the quality and availability of the parts used, and the discounts offered by mass production. As a result, the final cost may potentially exceed that of typical pre-built computers.

Home-built computers are often used at home, like home computers, but home computers are traditionally purchased already assembled by the manufacturer. Some suppliers provide both home and homebuilt computers, like the Newbear 77-68, which the owner was expected to assemble and use in their home.

== History ==
Mechanical (non-electric) computers were built in homes during the Victorian era, beginning with pioneer Charles Babbage in the 1820s. In the 20th century, Konrad Zuse built his own machine when electromechanical relay technology was widely available. In 1965, electronics engineer James Sutherland started building a computer out of surplus parts from his job at Westinghouse. The hobby became more accessible with the early development of microprocessors, which led to many enthusiasts constructing their own computers.

Early examples include the Altair 8800 from the United States and the later British Newbear 77-68 and Nascom designs from the late 70's and early 80's. Some were made from kits of components, while others were distributed as board designs like the Ferguson Big Board. The Altair 8800 pioneered the S-100 bus which somewhat simplified the process.

The development of home computers, the IBM PC (and its derivatives and clones) and the industry of specialized component suppliers that developed around this market in the mid-1980s have made building computers more intuitive, especially with the development of modular components.

Computers based on Apple Macintosh and Amiga computer platforms often cannot be legally built by users because of patents and licenses for their hardware, firmware, and software.

== Development as a hobby ==
Building desktop PCs has become a popular hobby for many, especially for those who play video games. Customization is a major selling point for homebuilding; hobbyists may add components ranging from multiple hard drives, case mods, high-performance graphics cards, liquid cooling, multi-head high-resolution monitor configurations or alternative operating systems. Depending on the components used, a homebuilt computer can outperform pre-built models.

As prices for components have increased over time, it has become less cost-effective for most users to build their own computers. Conversely, pre-built computers continue to improve in quality and performance, with manufacturers offering more options among their computers. The growing popularity of laptops and tablets has led to a mobile-first design methodology that is difficult for home builders to duplicate economically. Despite this, some enthusiasts continue to build their own PCs to enjoy the benefit of having more control over their own machines.

With the rise of virtual reality headsets (VR) such as the HTC Vive, the demand for high performance computing has risen. Competitive games with their own dedicated tournaments have brought about more builders due to the more effective customization for performance needs.

== Standardization ==
Most PCs, and some laptops, are built from readily interchangeable standard parts. Even in the more specialized laptop market, a considerable degree of standardization exists in the basic design, although it may not be easily accessible to end-users. Although motherboards are specialized to work only with either Intel or AMD processors, all other parts like graphic processors, RAM, and chassis/computer cases have been standardized to fit any setup. The availability of standard PC components has led to the development of small-scale custom PC assembly. White box PC manufacturers and commercial "build to order" services range in size from small local supply operations to large international operations.

== Kits and barebones systems ==
Computer kits include all of the hardware (and sometimes the operating system software, as well) needed to build a complete computer. Because the components are pre-selected by the vendor, the planning and design stages of the computer-building project are eliminated, and the builder's experience will consist solely of assembling the computer and installing the operating system. Reputable kit suppliers should have also tested the components to ensure that they are compatible.

A barebones computer is a variation of the kit concept. A barebones system typically consists of a computer case with a power supply, motherboard, processor, and processor cooler. A wide variety of other combinations are also possible: some barebones systems come with just the case and the motherboard, while other systems are virtually complete. In either case, the purchaser will need to obtain and install whatever parts are not included in the barebones kit (typically the hard drive, Random Access Memory, peripheral devices, and operating system).

Like mass-produced computers, barebones systems and computer kits are often targeted to particular types of users, and even different age groups. Because many home computer builders are gamers, for example, and because gamers are often young people, barebones computers marketed as "gaming systems" often include features such as neon lights and brightly coloured cases, as well as features more directly related to performance such as a fast processor, a generous amount of RAM, and a powerful video card. Other kits and barebones systems may be specifically marketed to users of a free software operating system such as Linux or one of the BSD variants, with components guaranteed for compatibility and performance with that operating system.

== Scavenged and "cannibalized" systems ==
Many amateur-built computers are built primarily from used or spare parts. These types of computers are built from numerous components that were taken from other computers that are otherwise broken, outdated or no longer being used. It is sometimes necessary to build a computer that will run an obsolete operating system (such as Windows 7) or other proprietary software for which updates are no longer available and will not run properly on a current platform.

Economic reasons may also be a factor for an individual to build a new computer from used parts, especially among young people (including teenagers) or in developing countries where the cost of new equipment places it out of reach for the average person.

== Advantages and disadvantages ==
=== Advantages ===
There are several benefits and advantages to building one's own computer compared to purchasing a mass-produced model:

==== Personal preference ====
Homebuilt computers are often customized to suit the user's needs in regards to quality, price, and availability.

==== Recycling computers, components, and upgrading ====
Homebuilt computers can also be made to recycle an older computer, or to upgrade internal components such as the motherboard, CPU, video card, etc.

==== High-end computing ====
Homebuilt computers can be built using only top-quality parts for gaming, multimedia, or other demanding tasks.

==== Removal of shovelware ====
Homebuilt computers avoid shovelware, trial software and other commission-driven additions that are usually added to mass-market computers before they are shipped to end-users.

==== Use of standardized parts and upgrading ====
Homebuilt computers ensure the use of industry-standard parts for operating system compatibility or to upgrade the original build at a later date with little hassle.

==== Separate OS and driver discs ====
Homebuilt computers ensure that one has all the individual driver and OS discs, provided the user can source them. Many manufactured computers usually come with one or two discs — one containing the OS, and another containing the drivers required, plus all the shovelware that was initially installed.

==== Educational value and experience ====
Homebuilt computers can offer an educational experience and personal satisfaction for those who enjoy the manufacturing process.

==== Cheaper to build ====
In most cases, it is cheaper to build a computer than to purchase a mass-market computer with the same specifications due to the lack of labor costs.

=== Disadvantages ===
Despite the aforementioned benefits, there are some drawbacks and compromises to building one's own computer:

==== Poorly designed systems and cases ====
A poorly designed system or case may have several flaws that would be exposed during a manufacturer's testing. For instance, a case chosen solely based on looks may have poor ventilation for hardware requirements. For this reason, it is typically recommended to use a case that favors better airflow within the system over the aesthetics. In some cases, a poorly designed power supply may cause a fire or kill components.

==== Knowledge requirements based on computer hardware and education ====
Assembling a homebuilt computer requires the user to be skilled and have some basic knowledge and education of computer hardware beforehand, such as how all the components work and how they interact. Considerations such as airflow, compatibility among components, space constraints inside the computer case and PCIe lanes and slots are some of the most important points for people to educate themselves on before building a computer. Studying a guide on building and buying computer components is also advised.

Additionally, for similar reasons, finding certain components is not possible without prior knowledge of sourcing computer components.

==== Lack of technical support ====
The lack of technical support and warranty protection other than what may be provided by the individual component and software vendors can create a disadvantage compared to a prebuilt computer. However, a person assembling a computer likely has the expertise to maintain the system (assuming they have basic knowledge of computer hardware and the skills to build one) and would require little assistance from manufacturers.

== Custom-built computers and high-performance systems ==
Most mainstream manufactured computers use common or inexpensive parts such as onboard graphics and audio. While integrated accessories offer dramatic economic savings (and satisfy many users), these options generally do not perform as well as dedicated hardware under high-demand situations such as current games, CAD, and media production.

Homebuilt computers are most common among gamers, engineers, or other people who demand more performance from a specific component than the average user. An example would be a gamer using a slightly outdated CPU and disk drive, spending the difference on a more capable dedicated graphics card.

Additionally, those with more specific computer needs usually appreciate being able to upgrade certain components to fit their needs and the evolving needs of the software being used; in a typical manufactured PC the support components (such as power supply unit, motherboard, or even the chassis) are unfit for accepting high-performance add-in components. Constructing a system with future expansion in mind allows for such upgrades, which in turn are much cheaper than buying a brand-new computer every time individual components become obsolete or insufficient to meet the needs of the user.

High-end PCs most often fall in the realm of heavy processor or memory usage applications such as multimedia PCs, home theater PCs, music production, engineering, and many more. Generally, a high-end system is capable of meeting the demands of gaming and can be used as such. A major difference between a high-end PC and a gaming PC is likely to only be the choice in video card since they will share a majority of other components. While a general-purpose high-end computer may be put to use in a render farm or as a file server and be provisioned with components targeted at this use (such as a fast GPU for rendering or high-performance storage for serving files), most gaming takes place in real time, so all the components matter in creating a flawless and seamless experience. A less-intensive type of build satisfies or exceeds the needs of most computer users.

== See also ==
- White box (computer hardware)
- Hackintosh
- Barebone computer
- Enthusiast computing
- Future-proofing
- PCPartPicker
