= Newbear 77-68 =

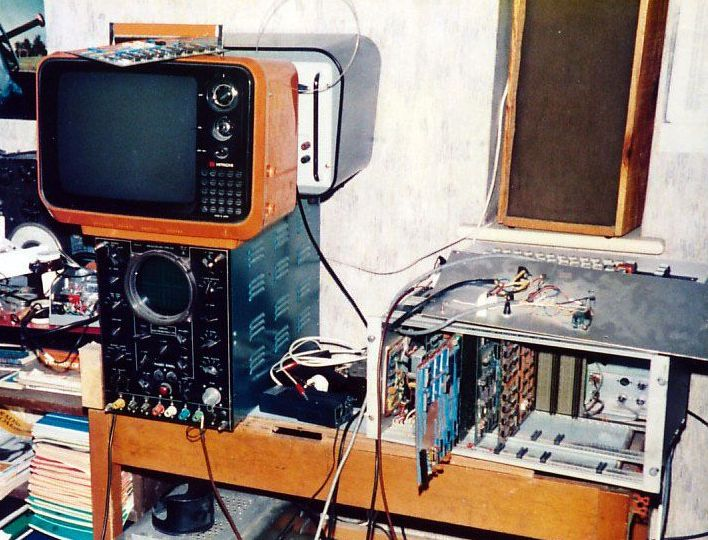
A Newbear 77-68 under construction. The orange TV set is the VDU, the metal rack to the right contains the computer circuit boards and the keyboard is just visible, partially obscured by the rack front panel lying on the top. The 1950s blue oscilloscope to the left was an essential de-bugging tool

The Newbear 77-68 was a kit of parts from which a purchaser could construct a first generation home computer based around a Motorola 6800 microprocessor. The 77-68 was designed by Tim Moore and was offered for sale by Bear Microcomputer Systems of Newbury, Berkshire, England from June 1977. It was among the first, if not the first, of British home computers and was featured in the launch edition of Personal Computer World magazine in February 1978.

The Newbear 77-68 was both a home computer and a homebuilt computer, since it was designed to not only be used at home (hence a home computer), but also be assembled at home by its owner (hence a homebuilt computer).

== Description ==
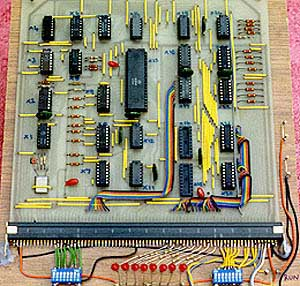
A bare-bones Newbear 77-68 The blue and white block of DIP switches to the bottom left addressed a word of memory; the LEDs in the bottom centre displayed the contents of that word and the switches to the bottom right could be set to enter a program or data, one word at a time.

The basic 77-68 comprised an 8-inch square printed circuit board accommodating the microprocessor, Static RAM of 256 8 bit words and the bare essentials in terms of input/output and timing logic to make a working computer. The processor ran with an instruction cycle time of around 1.25 microseconds with most instructions executing in 3 to 7 microseconds.

In the short time for which the 77-68 represented an economic and reasonably current technology for home computing, an active user group distributed designs for additional components such as memory cards, video display cards and teletype interfaces which enthusiasts could, and did, construct themselves. It was even possible to run BASIC. All the components to build the basic machine could be bought for around £50 with additional elements added later. This was a sensible approach at a time when, for example, 16K x 1 bit dynamic memory chips cost £7 each and 8 chips plus a significant amount of support logic were required to build a memory card.

== Operation ==
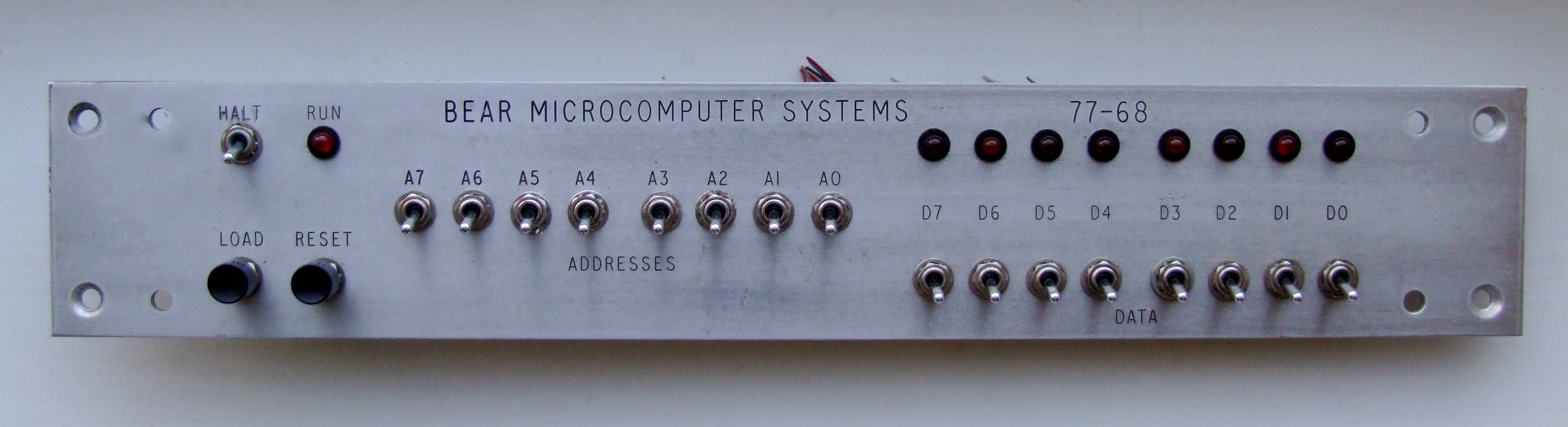
A Newbear 77-68 front panel

The 77-68 was programmed in its most basic form with toggle switches and LEDs. With the microprocessor's operation suspended in "HALT" mode, memory words could be accessed and their contents observed in binary. The word could then be modified directly using an additional 8 binary toggle switches to specify the data required. Once a complete program had been "toggled in" using this method, the "HALT" condition could be removed using another switch and the microprocessor would look for an address at which to start executing the program in the last two words of the address space.

This technique, called Direct Memory Access was typical for many early computers using volatile memory that did not retain its contents when the power was switched off. Even early mainframe computers required their operators to "toggle" or "dial" in a bootstrap program by hand to get things going on power-up.

== Capability ==
Although 256 words of memory seems extraordinarily small by contemporary standards, when "toggling in" programs by hand it seemed quite adequate. There was ample space to create programs that played music, sent and received morse code, operated data storage to media such as a cassette player and even offered game experiences (though these required significant imagination by the user).

Expanded with additional memory, the 77-68 was quite capable of running software such as the TSC BASIC interpreter and users wrote software that offered a wide range of applications at a time when even word processors were a novelty and spreadsheets were largely unknown.

== User experience and legacy ==
For many home computer pioneers, microcomputers like the 77-68 offered an experience distinct from using modern, highly advanced technology. Assembling a machine from individual components and programming it to perform basic tasks gave users a direct understanding of computing. During this period, non-specialists could realistically understand every aspect of the system they built allowing them to own and experiment with a computer for the first time. Although the number of kits sold and constructed and the number of systems still in operation is unknown, one of the systems illustrated in this article is now in the Museum of Computing, Swindon, England.
