= Deskmate =

Desk mate or deskmate may refer to:

- Tandy DeskMate, a graphical shell for a character based command operating system, either TRSDOS or MSDOS
- Deskmate, a person sharing desks in hot desking
- Deskmate, a co-office worker who is a situated at a neighbouring office desk
- Deskmate, a student classmate with the same or neighbouring school desks

== See also ==
- Classmates (disambiguation)
- Desk (disambiguation)
- Mate (disambiguation)
