= White box (computer hardware) =

Type of hardware (like a PC) without a well-known brand name

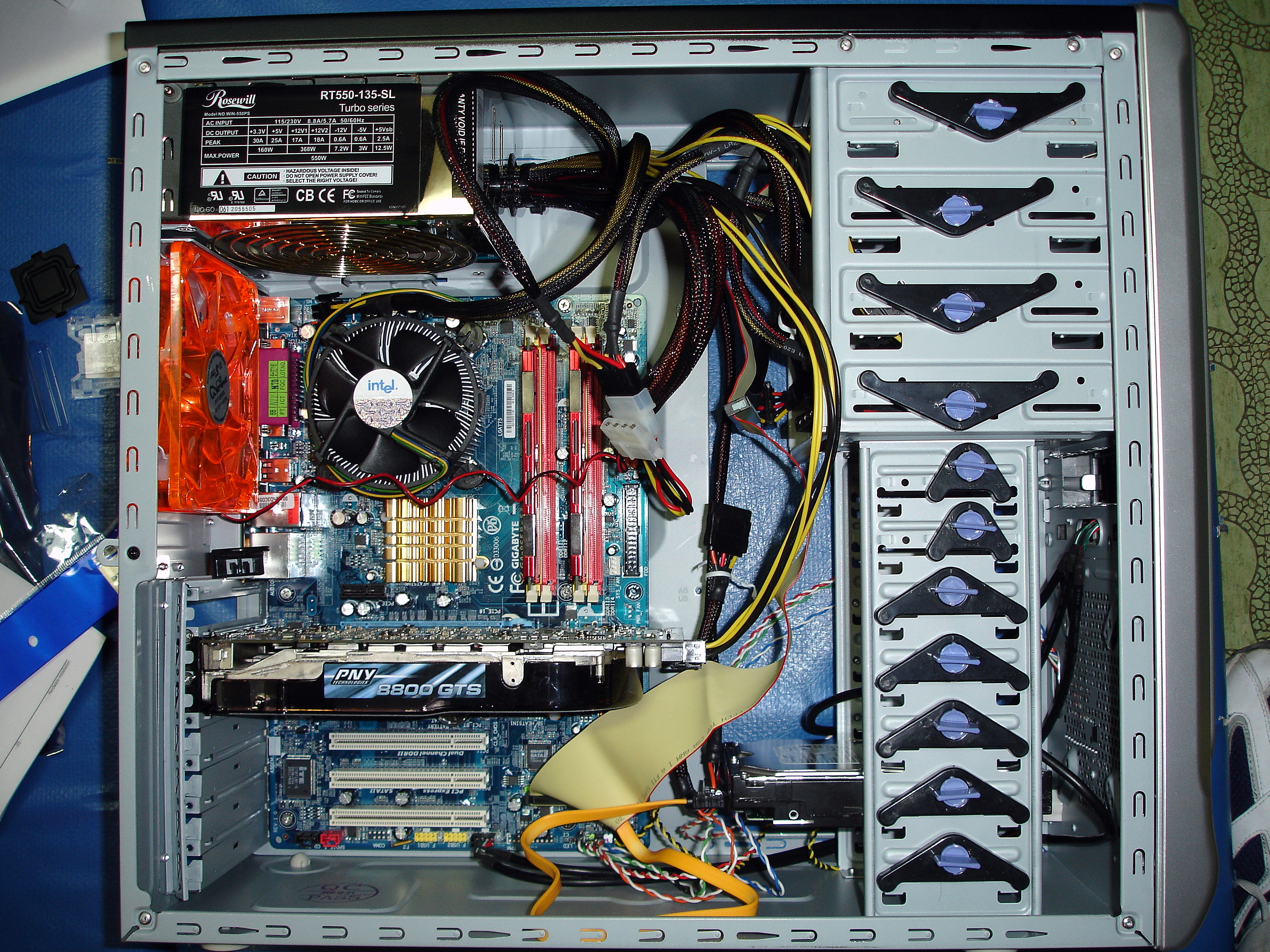
The inside of a white box computer

In computer hardware, a white box is a personal computer or server without a well-known brand name.

The term is usually applied to systems assembled by small system integrators and to homebuilt computer systems assembled by end users from parts purchased separately at retail. In this sense, building a white box system is part of the DIY movement.

The term is also applied to high volume production of unbranded PCs that began in the mid-1980s with 8 MHz Turbo XT systems selling for just under $1000. Dell began as a white box vendor.

In 2002, around 30% of personal computers sold annually were white box systems.

== Operating systems ==
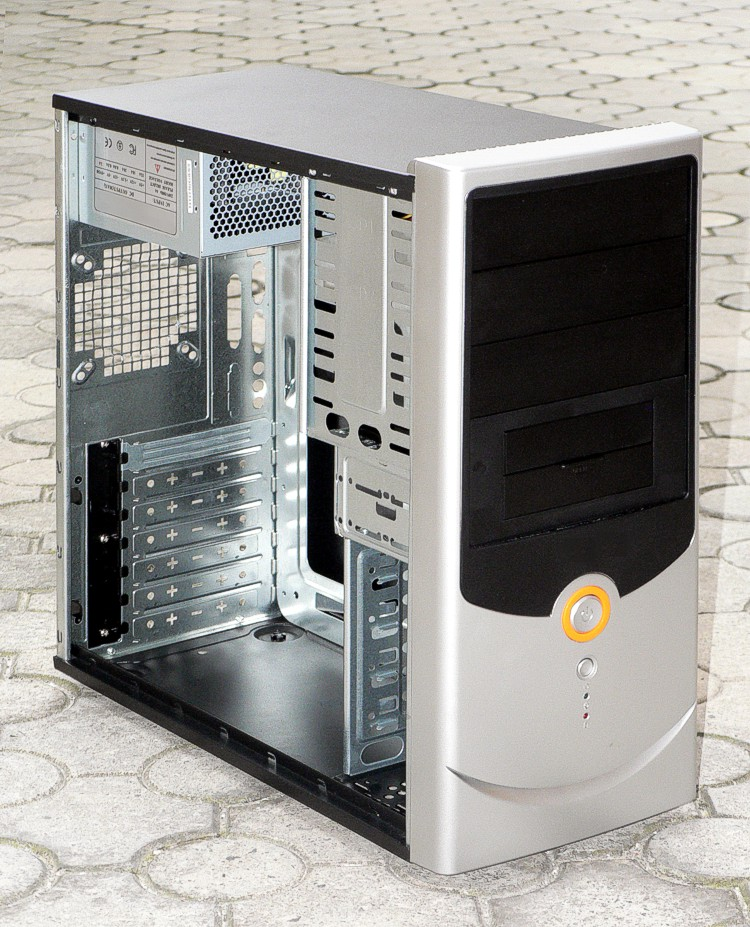
A typical "white box" ATX mid-tower case as used by a systems builder

While PCs built by system manufacturers generally come with a pre-installed operating system, white boxes from both large and small system vendors and other VAR channels can be ordered with or without a pre-installed OS. Usually when ordered with an operating system, the system builder uses an OEM copy of the OS.

== Whitebook or Intel "Common Building Blocks" ==
Intel defined form factor and interconnection standards for notebook computer components, including "Barebones" (chassis and motherboard), hard disk drive, optical disk drive, LCD, battery pack, keyboard, and AC/DC adapter. These building blocks are primarily marketed to computer building companies, rather than DIY users.

== Costs ==
While saving money is a common motivation for building one's own PC, it is not always cheaper. For example, in the US it is generally more expensive to build a low-end PC than to buy a pre-built one from a well-known manufacturer.

== See also ==
- Beige box
- Enthusiast computing
- Homebuilt computer
- White-label product
