= John Miller-Kirkpatrick =

British computer scientist

John Miller-Kirkpatrick (August 1946 – December 1978) was a British computer scientist known for The Scrumpi, a crude computer sold in kit form (1976). He founded Bywood Electronics.
