= Doukyusei (disambiguation) =

Dōkyūsei is a 1992 video game.

Dōkyūsei may also refer to:

- Classmates (manga), a manga series released in Japan as Doukyusei
