= PCPartPicker =

American comparison shopping website

- Screenshot of PCPartPicker's homepage on January 9, 2025
- Website type: Comparison shopping
- Country of origin: United States
- Owners: PCPartPicker, LLC
- Founder: Philip Carmichael
- Industry: Ecommerce
- Website: pcpartpicker.com
- Registration: Optional, but required to create custom parts and comment
- Users: 1,000,000+
- Current status: Online

PCPartPicker is a comparison shopping website that allows users to compare prices and compatibility of computer components on different retailers whilst also having the ability to put together and save lists of PC components online.

== History ==
PCPartPicker was created by Philip Carmichael in 2011. The website was substantially redesigned in February 2015. As of 2023 the site has expanded into an app and provides localized currencies and links to physical stores in 38 countries. The website is funded through affiliate linking to sites such as Amazon.com. Additional functionality is available, such as providing building guides, sharing build lists, photos, and instruction, alerts for price drops, forums, and filters for automatically adjusting pre-made lists of components. They also make PC hardware reviews and custom build tutorials on their YouTube channel. They are currently located in Austin, Texas.
