= Ambler (surname) =

Ambler is an English surname. It may refer to:

- Alfred Ambler (1879–unknown), English footballer
- Charles Ambler (footballer) (1868–1952), English footballer
- Charles Ambler (barrister) (1721–1794), English barrister and politician
- Charles Henry Ambler (1876–1957), American historian and writer
- David Ambler (born 1989), New Zealand sprinter
- Eric Ambler (1909–1998), British suspense novelist
- Fred Ambler (1894–1983), New Zealand businessman and politician
- Geoffrey Ambler (1904–1978), Royal Air Force officer
- George Ambler (born 1950), American politician
- Henry S. Ambler (1836–1905), American politician
- Jacob A. Ambler (1829–1906), American politician
- James Markham Ambler (1848–1881), American naval surgeon
- Joe Ambler (1860–1899), English cricketer
- John Ambler (1924–2008), British businessman married to Princess Margaretha of Sweden
- Joss Ambler (1900–1959), Australian-born British film and television actor
- Kevin Ambler (born 1961), American lawyer and politician
- Luke Ambler (born 1989), Irish rugby league player
- Princess Margaretha, Mrs. Ambler (born 1934), Swedish princess, sister of King Carl XVI Gustaf
- Ned Ambler, American filmmaker and photographer
- Pat Ambler (1936–2017), Scottish roboticist
- Richard Ambler (1933–2013), English molecular biologist
- Richard Charles Ambler (1853–1891), American politician
- Roy Ambler (1937–2007), English footballer
- Scott Ambler (born 1966), Canadian software engineer and author
- Stella Ambler (born 1966), Canadian politician
- Thomas Ambler (1838–1920), English architect
- Wayne Ambler (1915–1998), American Major League Baseball player
