= Ikarus (Scheme implementation) =

R6RS Scheme compiler

Ikarus Scheme
- Ikarus Scheme logo showing the mythic character Icarus flying across the sun.
- Paradigms: Multi-paradigm: functional, imperative, meta
- Family: Lisp
- Designed by: Abdulaziz Ghuloum
- Developer: Abdulaziz Ghuloum
- First appeared: October 31, 2007; 18 years ago
- Final release: 0.0.3 / February 2, 2008; 17 years ago
- Preview release: 0.0.3 / February 2, 2008; 17 years ago
- Typing discipline: Dynamic, latent, strong
- Scope: Lexical
- Implementation language: Scheme, C
- Platform: IA-32
- OS: Cross-platform: macOS, Linux, FreeBSD, NetBSD, Windows XP
- License: GPL

Influenced by
- Lisp, Scheme

Ikarus Scheme is a free software optimizing incremental compiler for R6RS Scheme that compiles directly to the x86 IA-32 architecture. Ikarus is the first public implementation of a large part of the R6RS Scheme standard. Version 0.0.3 has 94% of the total R6RS forms and procedures. Development stopped in 2008.

== Design ==
The compiler developer, Abdulaziz Ghuloum, was a Ph.D. student at Indiana University under R. Kent Dybvig, the developer of Chez Scheme, who has influenced the development of Ikarus.

Some of the ideas behind the design of Ikarus Scheme are detailed in "An Incremental Approach to Compiler Construction" by the developer. Ikarus is self-hosting with most of the compiler and primitives written in Scheme and only a few parts of the runtime system written in C. Also, rather than using an external intermediate language like C, LLVM, or C--, it compiles directly to machine code to better exploit the underlying machine architecture.

Ikarus uses the portable R6RS library and syntax-case system which is also developed by Abdulaziz Ghuloum and is described in a paper, "Implicit phasing for R6RS libraries". Finally, the paper "Generation-Friendly Eq Hash Tables" covers the hash table implementation in Ikarus.

== System requirements ==
Ikarus runs on x86 but requires SSE2 support to handle floating-point arithmetic (FP) computations so it will not produce code for Intel chips earlier than Pentium 4 or for Advanced Micro Devices (AMD) chips before Athlon 64. Release 0.0.3 has been tested and runs on:

- macOS, version 10.4 and 10.5
- Linux, 2.6.18; Debian, Fedora, Gentoo, and Ubuntu
- FreeBSD, version 6.2
- NetBSD, version 3.1
- Windows XP, using Cygwin 1.5.24
