= Incremental compiler =

An incremental compiler is a kind of incremental computation applied to the field of compilation. Quite naturally, whereas ordinary compilers make a so-called clean build, that is, (re)build all program modules, an incremental compiler recompiles only modified portions of a program.

== Definition ==
=== Imperative programming ===
In imperative programming and software development, incremental compilation takes only the changes of a known set of source files and updates any corresponding output files (in the compiler's target language, often bytecode) that may already exist from previous compilations. By effectively building upon previously compiled output files, an incremental compiler avoids the wasteful recompiling of entire source files, where most of the code remains unchanged. For most incremental compilers, compiling a program with small changes to its source code is usually near instantaneous. It can be said that an incremental compiler reduces the granularity of a language's traditional compiling units while maintaining the language's semantics, such that the compiler can append and replace smaller parts.

Many programming tools take advantage of incremental compilers to provide developers with a much more interactive programming environment. It is not unusual that an incremental compiler is invoked for every change of a source file, such that the developer is almost immediately informed about any compilation errors that would arise as a result of their changes to the code. This scheme, in contrast with traditional compilation, shortens a programmer's development cycle significantly, because they would no longer have to wait for a long compile process before being informed of errors.

One downside to this type of incremental compiler is that it cannot easily optimize the code that it compiles, due to locality and the limited scope of what is changed. This is usually not a problem, because for optimization is usually only carried out on release, an incremental compiler would be used throughout development, and a standard batch compiler would be used on release.

=== Interactive programming ===
In the interactive programming paradigm, e.g. in Poplog related literature, an interactive compiler refers to a compiler that is actually a part of the runtime system of the source language. The compiler can be invoked at runtime on some source code or data structure managed by the program, which then produces a new compiled program fragment containing machine code that is then immediately available for use by the runtime system. If the newly compiled fragment replaces a previous compiled procedure the old one will be garbage collected. This scheme allows for a degree of self-modifying code and requires metaprogramming language features. The ability to add, remove and delete code while running is known as hot swapping. Some interactive programming platforms mix the use of interpreted and compiled code to achieve the illusion that any changes to code are accessible by the program immediately.

== List of incremental compilers ==
Imperative and functional languages

- The PECAN Programming Environment Generator was an incremental compiler, developed by Steven P. Reiss in the early 1980s.
- GNU Compiler Collection has branched off its development with the IncrementalCompiler project, concentrating in providing C/C++ with a fast incremental compiler
- The Eclipse platform has included an incremental compiler for Java as a part of the Java Development Tools project
- The Gradle build tool has supported incremental Java compilation since version 2.1.
- IBM VisualAge C++ compiler 4.0
- Embarcadero Delphi
- The .NET Compiler Platform (C# and Visual Basic .NET)
- Rust
- Go
- Forth
- Ceylon
- OCaml
- GNAT, the GNU Ada compiler
- PTC ObjectAda

Interactive environments and runtime systems

- Poplog (its core language POP-11 and its predecessor POP-2)
- Versions of Lisp:
  - Steel Bank Common Lisp
  - Carnegie Mellon University Common Lisp
  - Scieneer Common Lisp
  - GNU CLISP
  - Franz Allegro Common Lisp
- Versions of Scheme:
  - Ikarus
  - Chez Scheme
- Versions of Prolog:
  - SWI-Prolog
  - Yap Prolog
  - XSB
- Versions of ML:
  - Standard ML of New Jersey (Bell Labs' headquarters resides in New Jersey)
  - Poplog ML

== See also ==
- Dynamic compilation
- Hot swapping § Software
- Incremental build (build system)
