= Concurrent ML =

Programming language

- Paradigms: Multi-paradigm: functional, imperative, modular, concurrent
- Family: ML: Standard ML
- First appeared: 1991; 35 years ago
- Website: cml.cs.uchicago.edu

Major implementations
- SML/NJ, MLton, Manticore

Influenced by
- ML, Standard ML

Concurrent ML (CML) is a multi-paradigm, general-purpose, high-level, functional programming language. It is a dialect of the programming language ML which is a concurrent extension of the Standard ML language, characterized by its ability to allow creating composable communication abstractions that are first-class rather than built into the language. The design of CML and its primitive operations have been adopted in several other programming languages, such as GNU Guile, Racket, and Manticore.

== Concepts ==
Many programming languages that support concurrency offer communication channels that allow the exchange of values between processes or threads running concurrently in a system. Communications established between processes may follow a specific protocol, requiring the programmer to write functions to establish the required pattern of communication. Meanwhile, a communicating system often requires establishing multiple channels, such as to multiple servers, and then choosing between the available channels when new data is available. This can be accomplished using polling, such as with the select operation on Unix systems.

Combining both application-specific protocols and multi-party communication may be complicated due to the need to introduce polling and checking for blocking within a pre-existing protocol. Concurrent ML solves this problem by reducing this coupling of programming concepts by introducing synchronizable events. Events are a first-class abstraction that can be used with a synchronization operation (called sync in CML and Racket) in order to potentially block and then produce some value resulting from communication (for example, data transmitted on a channel).

In CML, events can be combined or manipulated using a number of primitive operations. Each primitive operation constructs a new event rather than modifying the event in-place, allowing for the construction of compound events that represent the desired communication pattern. For example, CML allows the programmer to combine several sub-events in order to create a compound event that can then make a non-deterministic choice of one of the sub-events. Another primitive creates a new event that will modify the value resulting from synchronization to the original event. These events embody patterns of communication that, in a non-CML language, would typically be handled using a polling loop or function with handlers for each kind of event.

== Hello world ==
Here is a "Hello, World!" program that prints to the system console. It spawns one thread with a channel for strings, and another thread which prints a string received on the channel. It uses Standard ML of New Jersey (SML/NJ) and CML. (On non linux-x86 platforms, the heap name will differ; the line with "cml_test.x86-linux" may need changing to something different.)

cml_test.cm

Library
    structure Hello
is
    $cml/basis.cm
    $cml/cml.cm
    cml_test.sml

cml_test.sml

structure Hello = struct
    open CML

    fun hello () = let
        val c : string chan = channel ()
        in
            spawn (fn () => TextIO.print (recv c));
            send (c, "Hello, world!\n");
            exit ()
        end

    fun main (_, argv) =
        RunCML.doit (fn () => ignore (spawn hello), NONE)
end

bash

$ ml-build cml_test.cm Hello.main
Standard ML of New Jersey v110.60 [built: Mon Nov 27 14:19:21 2006]
[scanning cml_test.cm]
[library $cml/basis.cm is stable]
[library $cml/cml.cm is stable]
[parsing (cml_test.cm):cml_test.sml]
[creating directory .cm/SKEL]
[library $cml/cml-internal.cm is stable]
[library $cml/core-cml.cm is stable]
[library $SMLNJ-BASIS/basis.cm is stable]
[compiling (cml_test.cm):cml_test.sml]
[creating directory .cm/GUID]
[creating directory .cm/x86-unix]
[code: 2170, data: 42, env: 2561 bytes]
[scanning 18518-export.cm]
[scanning (18518-export.cm):cml_test.cm]
[parsing (18518-export.cm):18518-export.sml]
[compiling (18518-export.cm):18518-export.sml]
[code: 309, data: 37, env: 42 bytes]
$ heap2exec cml_test.x86-linux cml_test
$ ./cml_test
Hello, world!
