= Ambler =

Ambler may refer to:

== Places in the United States ==
- Ambler, Alaska, a city
- Ambler, Pennsylvania, an unincorporated community in Montgomery County, Pennsylvania, which includes the Borough of Ambler
- Ambler River, Alaska, a tributary of the Kobuk River

== Transportation-related ==
- Ambler Airport, Alaska, a state-owned, public-use airport
- Ambler station, a railroad station in Ambler, Pennsylvania
- Ambler's Texaco Gas Station, Dwight, Illinois, US

== People ==
- Ambler (surname)

== Other uses ==
- HMCS Ambler (Q11), a Royal Canadian Navy armed yacht during the Second World War
- Village of Euclid, Ohio v. Ambler Realty Co., US Supreme Court case
- A horse that can perform ambling gaits (also known as gaited horses, particularly in the U.S.)
