= Zabrodsky =

Zabrodsky is a surname. Notable people with the surname include:

- Hagit Zabrodsky, Israeli computer scientist
- Oldřich Zábrodský (1926–2015), Czech ice hockey player
- Stanislav Zabrodsky (born 1962), Ukrainian archer
- Vladimír Zábrodský (1923–2020), Czech ice hockey player
