= Freddy II =

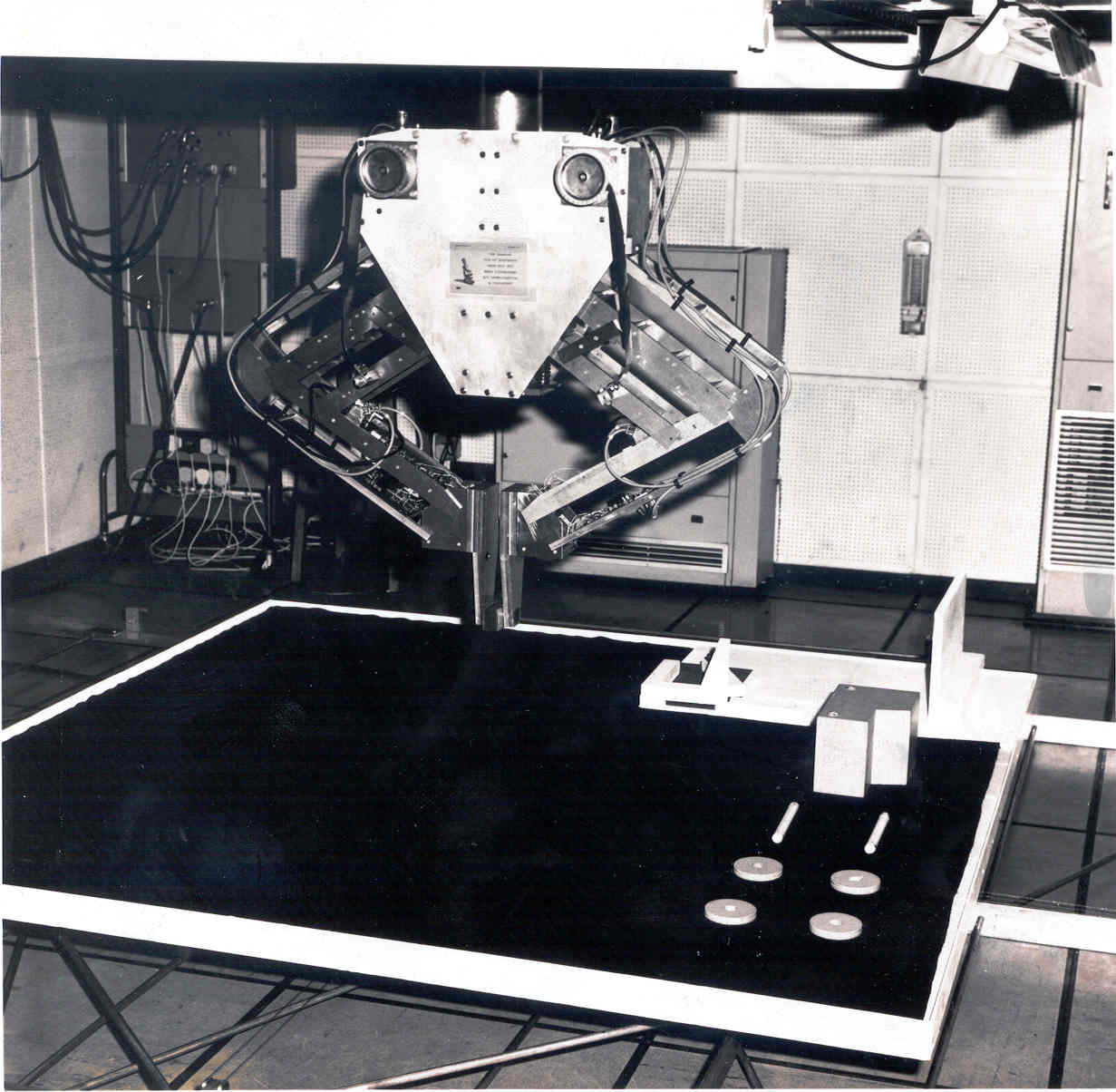
Freddy II Robot 1973-1976, Department of AI, University of Edinburgh

Freddy (1969–1971) and Freddy II (1973–1976) were experimental robots built in the Department of Machine Intelligence and Perception (later Department of Artificial Intelligence, now part of the School of Informatics at the University of Edinburgh).

== Technology ==
Technical innovations involving Freddy were at the forefront of the 70s robotics field. Freddy was one of the earliest robots to integrate vision, manipulation and intelligent systems as well as having versatility in the system and ease in retraining and reprogramming for new tasks. The idea of moving the table instead of the arm simplified the construction. Freddy also used a method of recognising the parts visually by using graph matching on the detected features. The system used an innovative collection of high level procedures for programming the arm movements which could be reused for each new task.

== Lighthill controversy ==
In the mid 1970s there was controversy about the utility of pursuing a general purpose robotics programme in both the USA and the UK. A BBC TV programme in 1973, referred to as the "Lighthill Debate", pitched James Lighthill, who had written a critical report for the science and engineering research funding agencies in the UK, against Donald Michie from the University of Edinburgh and John McCarthy from Stanford University. The Edinburgh Freddy II and Stanford/SRI Shakey robots were used to illustrate the state-of-the-art at the time in intelligent robotics systems.

== Freddy I and II ==
Freddy Mark I (1969–1971) was an experimental prototype, with 3 degrees-of-freedom created by a rotating platform driven by a pair of independent wheels. The other main components were a video camera and bump sensors connected to a computer. The computer moved the platform so that the camera could see and then recognise the objects.

Freddy II (1973–1976) was a 5 degrees of freedom manipulator with a large vertical 'hand' that could move up and down, rotate about the vertical axis and rotate objects held in its gripper around one horizontal axis. Two remaining translational degrees of freedom were generated by a work surface that moved beneath the gripper. The gripper was a two finger pinch gripper. A video camera was added as well as later a light stripe generator.

The Freddy and Freddy II projects were initiated and overseen by Donald Michie. The mechanical hardware and analogue electronics were designed and built by Stephen Salter (who also pioneered renewable energy from waves (see Salter's Duck)), and the digital electronics and computer interfacing were designed by Harry Barrow and Gregan Crawford. The software was developed by a team led by Rod Burstall, Robin Popplestone and Harry Barrow which used the POP-2 programming language, one of the world's first functional programming languages. The computing hardware was an Elliot 4130 computer with 384KB (128K 24-bit words) RAM and a hard disk linked to a small Honeywell H316 computer with 16KB of RAM which directly performed sensing and control.

Freddy was a versatile system which could be trained and reprogrammed to perform a new task in a day or two. The tasks included putting rings on pegs and assembling simple model toys consisting of wooden blocks of different shapes, a boat with a mast and a car with axles and wheels.

Information about part locations was obtained using the video camera, and then matched to previously stored models of the parts.

It was soon realised in the Freddy project that the 'move here, do this, move there' style of robot behavior programming (actuator or joint level programming) is tedious and also did not allow for the robot to cope with variations in part position, part shape and sensor noise. Consequently, the RAPT robot programming language was developed by Pat Ambler and Robin Popplestone, in which robot behavior was specified at the object level.

This meant that robot goals were specified in terms of desired position relationships between the robot, objects and the scene, leaving the details of how to achieve the goals to the underlying software system. Although developed in the 1970s RAPT is still considerably more advanced than most commercial robot programming languages.

The team of people who contributed to the project were leaders in the field at the time and included Pat Ambler, Harry Barrow, Ilona Bellos, Chris Brown, Rod Burstall, Gregan Crawford, Jim Howe, Donald Michie, Robin Popplestone, Stephen Salter, Austin Tate and Ken Turner.

Also of interest in the project was the use of a structured-light 3D scanner to obtain the 3D shape and position of the parts being manipulated.

The Freddy II robot is currently on display at the Royal Museum in Edinburgh, Scotland, with a segment of the assembly video shown in a continuous loop.
