= Cognitive shuffle =

Strategy meant to facilitate initial sleep onset

The cognitive shuffle is a cognitive strategy meant to facilitate initial sleep onset, or subsequent sleep onset after early awakening from sleep. The cognitive shuffle was developed by Luc P. Beaudoin, an adjunct professor at Simon Fraser University. It is based on Beaudoin's theory of the human sleep onset control system called the somnolent information processing theory (SIP), according to which mental perturbance is insomnolent, meaning that it can delay sleep onset.

== Research ==
=== Serial Diverse Imagining ===
The cognitive shuffle is a cognitive strategy in which one thinks about a neutral or pleasant target for a short period of time (normally every 5–15 seconds) and then switches to thinking about an unrelated target. Serial diverse imagining (SDI) is a type of cognitive shuffling in which people switch between imagining various concrete images, such as persons, places, actions, and/or scenes. However, practitioners are instructed not to relate mental images with each other. A variation of SDI involves imagining oneself drawing a target person, place, things, action, and/or scene (analogous to Pictionary).

Beaudoin views cognitive shuffling as a new form of meditation in that it involves deliberate control of mentation, involving meta-cognition in general and meta-cognitive control in particular.

Beaudoin has also distinguished two forms of SDI, technology-assisted SDI and self-directed SDI. In technology-assisted SDI, participants use software to generate a random sequence of words that they will imagine a configurable number of seconds (usually 5–10 seconds) apart. Sequences of words may be delivered through text-to-speech technology. In self-directed SDI, participants think of a word between 5-12 letters. Each letter in the word functions as a cue letter. For each letter, participants visualize a target that starts with the letter and an instance involving the target for 5–10 seconds. After exhausting all letters, participants can produce new words and continue the practice until they have fallen asleep.

Pilot data on SDI and the cognitive shuffle was collected using the mobile sleep app SomnoTest.

=== Somnolent Information Processing Theory ===
The cognitive shuffle is based on Beaudoin's somnolent information processing theory. The somnolent information processing theory postulates the existence of a sleep onset control system that evolved to ensure that falling asleep tends to happen when it is evolutionarily opportune (safe, timely) to fall asleep. The theory claims that control of human somnolence posed a significant evolutionary challenge particularly due to the hyper-abundant cerebral cortex of humans. Beaudoin's theory stipulates that somnolence (propensity for sleep) is deemed to be a function of the sleep onset control system. External cues (such as physical threats) and internal mechanisms (such as alarms or mental perturbance) are deemed to be insomnolent, meaning they tend to delay sleep onset; or pro-somnolent, meaning they tend to promote sleep onset; or asomnolent, meaning they have no particular effect on sleep onset.

=== Mental perturbance ===
As noted above, mental perturbance is deemed in somnolent information processing theory to be insomnolent. The concept of mental perturbance (invoked in somnolent information processing theory) was originally expounded by Aaron Sloman, who referred to it as "emotion" in his earlier works. To distinguish this from other concepts of emotion, Beaudoin and Sloman introduced the technical term "perturbance". Beaudoin refers to Sloman's concept of emotion as "perturbance." Mental perturbance is an emergent state of mind in which an insistent motivator tends to control executive functions. Beaudoin claims that mental perturbance is insomnolent and that the cognitive shuffle can interfere with mental perturbance, making it "counter-insomnolent." Counter-insomnolent processes are information processes that interfere with insomnolent processes.

== Usage ==
Mobile apps such as mySleepButton and SomnoTest have been developed for technology-assisted SDI i.e., cognitive shuffling. The apps aid users in practicing SDI by supplying words and images for them to imagine.
