= COWSEL =

Programming language

COWSEL, POP-1
- Paradigm: Multi-paradigm: structured, reflective, procedural
- Family: Lisp: POP
- Designed by: Robin Popplestone, Rod Burstall
- Developers: University of Leeds, Bradford Institute of Technology, University of Edinburgh
- First appeared: 1964; 62 years ago
- Typing discipline: dynamic
- Implementation language: assembly
- Platform: Ferranti Pegasus, Stantec Zebra, Elliot 4120
- License: Proprietary

Influenced by
- CPL, Lisp

Influenced
- POP-2

COWSEL (COntrolled Working SpacE Language) is a programming language designed between 1964 and 1966 by Robin Popplestone. It was based on a reverse Polish notation (RPN) form of the language Lisp, combined with some ideas from Combined Programming Language (CPL).

COWSEL was initially implemented on a Ferranti Pegasus computer at the University of Leeds and on a Stantec Zebra at the Bradford Institute of Technology. Later, Rod Burstall implemented it on an Elliot 4120 at the University of Edinburgh.

COWSEL was renamed POP-1 in 1966, during summer, and development continued under that name from then on.

== Example code ==
function member
lambda x y
comment Is x a member of list y;
define      y atom then *0 end
            y hd x equal then *1 end
            y tl -> y repeat up

Reserved words (keywords) were also underlined in the original printouts. Popplestone performed syntax highlighting by using underscoring on a Friden Flexowriter.

== See also ==
- POP-2 programming language
- POP-11 programming language
- Poplog programming environment
