= Rod Burstall =

British computer scientist (1934–2025)

- Born: 11 November 1934; Liverpool, England
- Died: 13 February 2025 (aged 90)
- Education: University of Cambridge; University of Birmingham
- Known for: COWSEL (renamed POP-1), POP-2, NPL, Hope
- Awards: ACM SIGPLAN 2009 Programming Language Achievement Award
- Scientific career
- Fields: Computer science
- Workplaces: University of Edinburgh
- Doctoral advisor: N. A. Dudley; K. Brian Haley
- Doctoral students: Thorsten Altenkirch; John Darlington; Mike Gordon; Conor McBride; J Strother Moore; Alan Mycroft; Gordon Plotkin; Don Sannella
- Website: http://www.freewebs.com/rodburstall/

Rodney Martineau Burstall (11 November 1934 – 13 February 2025) was a British computer scientist who was one of four founders of the Laboratory for Foundations of Computer Science at the University of Edinburgh.

== Biography ==
Burstall studied physics at the University of Cambridge, then an M.Sc. in operational research at the University of Birmingham. He worked for three years before returning to Birmingham University to earn a Ph.D. in 1966 with thesis titled Heuristic and Decision Tree Methods on Computers: Some Operational Research Applications under the supervision of N. A. Dudley and K. B. Haley.

Burstall was an early and influential proponent of functional programming, pattern matching, and list comprehension, and is known for his work with Robin Popplestone on COWSEL (renamed POP-1) and POP-2, innovative programming languages developed at the University of Edinburgh around 1970, and later work with John Darlington on NPL and program transformation and with David MacQueen and Don Sannella on Hope, a precursor to Standard ML, Miranda, and Haskell. In 1995, he was elected a Fellow of the Royal Society of Edinburgh. Burstall retired in 2000, becoming Professor Emeritus.

In 2002, David Rydeheard and Don Sannella assembled a festschrift for Burstall that was published in Formal Aspects of Computing.

In 2009, he was awarded the Association for Computing Machinery (ACM) SIGPLAN Programming Language Achievement Award.

Burstall died on 13 February 2025, at the age of 90.

== Books ==
- May 1971: Programming in POP-11, Edinburgh University Press.
- 1980: (with Alan Bundy) Artificial Intelligence: An Introductory Course, Edinburgh University Press.
- 1988: (with D. E. Rydeheard) Computational Category Theory, Prentice-Hall, ISBN 978-0131627369.
