= Sannella =

Sannella could refer to one of the following people:

- Andy Sannella - musician who played on many jazz and dance band records from the 1920s
- Donald Sannella - professor at the University of Edinburgh; son of Ted Sannella
- Ted Sannella - contra dance and square dance caller; social dance choreographer; father of Donald Sannella
- Della Sannella - ancient name of the Simonetti family from Florence, mentioned in Dante's Divine Comedy

other

- Sannella (genus), an insect genus in the tribe Typhlocybini
