= EML programming language =

There are two EML programming languages:

- Extended ML, which is actually a specification language, and
- the Extensible ML programming language
