= The Ashcombe School =

Location
- Ashcombe Road; Dorking, Surrey, RH4 1LY; England; 51°14′19″N 0°19′46″W

Information
- Type: Academy
- Established: 1976
- Trust: South East Surrey Schools Education Trust
- Department for Education URN: 143901 Tables
- Ofsted: Reports
- Headteacher: Chris Panting
- Gender: Coeducational
- Age: 11 to 18
- Enrolment: 1408
- Houses: 4 (Vaughan Williams, Shilling, Robertson, and Pethick Lawrence)
- Colours: Navy blue and red
- Website: www.ashcombe.surrey.sch.uk

The Ashcombe School is a coeducational secondary school and sixth form located in Dorking in the English county of Surrey.

== History ==
The Ashcombe School was established in 1976, by the merger of Dorking County Grammar School and Mowbray School. The co-educational Dorking County Grammar School had been founded in 1931 with the Amalgamation of the Dorking High School for Boys (1884–1930) and St.Martin's Church Of England High School for Girls opened in 1903. Mowbray Secondary Modern School for Girls opened on an adjacent site in 1953. The schools were close enough to share the school kitchen.

The Ashcombe School became a Specialist Language College in September 1998, allowing it to receive additional funding. It was featured in the Independent and the Guardian as a school that teaches Mandarin.

Previously a community school administered by Surrey County Council, in January 2017 The Ashcombe School converted to academy status. The school is now sponsored by the South East Surrey Schools Education Trust.

== Notable former pupils ==
=== Dorking High School for Boys ===
- James Chuter Ede, Lord Chuter-Ede of Epsom, Labour MP and Home Secretary
- John Gandee, British diplomat; High Commissioner to Botswana from 1966 to 1969.

=== Dorking County Grammar School ===
- William Cole English conductor, composer and organist. Teacher at Dorking County School 1937-40
- Michael Colborne, Royal Navy officer and private secretary to Charles, Prince of Wales, and later the Duke of Westminster.
- Patricia Fothergill, pioneer in robotics and control languages, helped develop the Freddy II robot pioneer in robotics and robot control languages.
- Sir Stephen Lamport, Receiver General at Westminster Abbey, former diplomat and Deputy Private Secretary to the Prince of Wales.
- Liz Lynne, Former Liberal Democrat MP and MEP
- Tom Mangold, award-winning BBC journalist and writer
- Sir Erich Reich, Kindertransport refugee, Austrian-born entrepreneur and charity fundraiser.

=== The Ashcombe School ===
- Evan Davis, economist and BBC journalist
- Rich Good, Musician and co-founder of the band The Pleased, guitarist in the band Psychedelic Furs
- Sarah Ioannides, Classical conductor
- Jamie Mackie, Scotland international footballer
