= Stephen Lamport =

British diplomat (born 1951)

Sir Stephen Lamport GCVO, DL
- Born: Stephen Mark Jeffrey Lamport; 27 November 1951 (age 74)
- Education: Dorking County Grammar School; Corpus Christi College, Cambridge (BA), (MA); University of Sussex (MA)
- Occupations: Diplomat, private secretary, Receiver General of Westminster Abbey

Sir Stephen Mark Jeffrey Lamport, GCVO, DL (born 27 November 1951) is a former Receiver General of Westminster Abbey. He was previously a career diplomat and Private Secretary to the Prince of Wales.

== Biography ==
Lamport was educated at Dorking County Grammar School, and Corpus Christi College, Cambridge, where he was a scholar and gained a BA degree with first-class honours, which was subsequently upgraded to an MA degree. He also obtained a postgraduate MA degree from the University of Sussex.

He joined the Foreign and Commonwealth Office in 1974, and was assigned to the United Kingdom Mission to the United Nations in New York. In 1975 he became a 3rd Secretary From 1975 to 1979 he was in Tehran, initially as a 3rd Secretary and then a 2nd Secretary. From 1980 to 1984 he was a 1st Secretary in London, serving 1981-1984 as Private Secretary to two successive Ministers of State, Malcolm Rifkind and Douglas Hurd. From 1984 to 1988 he was 1st Secretary in Rome. He was Assistant Head of Department of the Middle East Department in about 1990. By 1991 he was Deputy Head of Department of Personnel Operations, as a Counsellor. By 1992 he was Deputy Head of Department of the Personnel Management Department.

He was Deputy Private Secretary to the Prince of Wales from March 1993, and then Private Secretary and Treasurer from October 1996 to 2002.

He was Group Director for Public Policy and Government Affairs for the Royal Bank of Scotland until 2007.

He was Receiver General of Westminster Abbey from 2008 to 2018, succeeding Major General David Burden who had held the position since 1999. Lamport is also a member of the Advisory Board of the Centre for Ethics in Public Policy and Corporate Governance of Glasgow Caledonian University.

Lamport was appointed CVO in 1999, and KCVO in 2002. He was appointed a Deputy Lieutenant of Surrey in March 2006. In 2018 Queen's Birthday Honours, he was appointed Knight Grand Cross of the Royal Victorian Order (GCVO). In March 2023, he was appointed an Extra Equerry to King Charles III.

He is married and has three children.

== Miscellaneous ==
In 1985 Lamport wrote a novel, The Palace of Enchantment, with Douglas Hurd.

He was portrayed by Tim McMullan in the film The Queen (2006), concerning events before and after the death of Diana, Princess of Wales in 1997. In the sixth season of The Crown, he was portrayed by Alex Blake.

== Offices held ==
Court offices
Preceded by Richard Aylard	Private Secretary to the Prince of Wales; 1996–2002	Succeeded by Sir Michael Peat
