= Erich Reich =

British businessman (1935–2022)

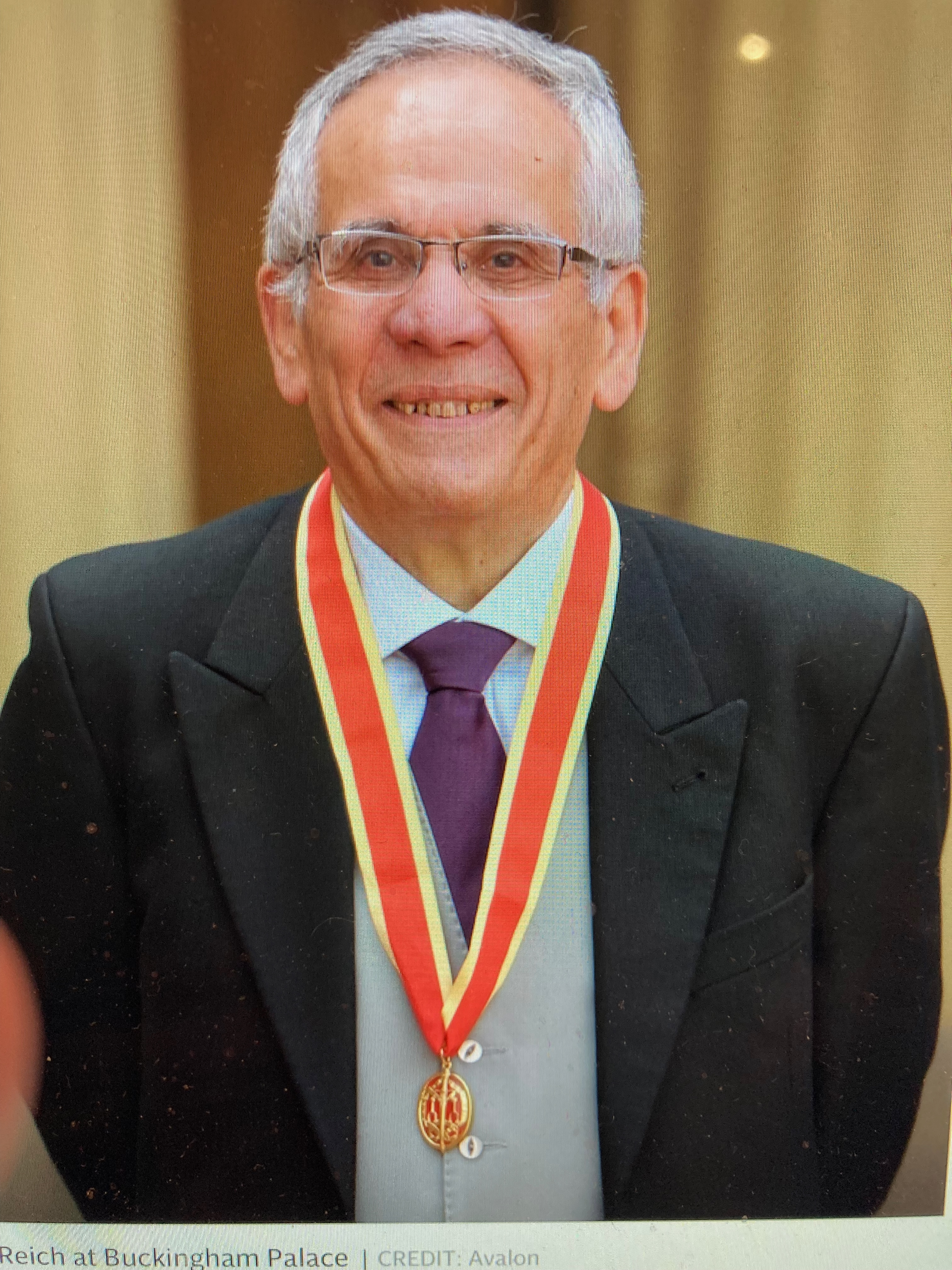
- Born: Erich Arieh Reich; 30 April 1935; Vienna, Federal State of Austria
- Died: 2 November 2022 (aged 87)
- Spouse: Linda Haase
- Children: 5

Sir Erich Arieh Reich (Hebrew: איריך רייך; 1935 – 2 November 2022) was an Austrian-born British entrepreneur based in London, who through his company Classic Tours inspired over 50,000 people to raise £90 million for over 300 UK charities.

== Early life ==
Reich was born in 1935 in Vienna, Austria. In 1938, he was one of the children of 5,000 families deported by Nazi Germany to Poland. Under the Kindertransport agreement, he arrived in the United Kingdom, aged 4, in August 1939, one of 10,000 children. He never saw his parents again; they were murdered in Auschwitz. Initially placed with a foster family in Dorking, Surrey, he attended Dorking County Grammar School from 1946 to 1948 when he moved to a Jewish school in North London. Aged 13, he emigrated to the new state of Israel in 1949.

== Career ==
Reich returned to London in 1967, working for Thomson Holidays, where by 1970 he was operations director. He then joined Thomas Cook, where by 1979 he was managing director of tour operations.

In 1987, he set up a travel company Classic Tours, that later specialised in activity-based global travel. In 2004, Reich had a complaint upheld by Ofcom, over a report by the BBC1's Watchdog programme into Classic Tours.

== Charity ==
In 1992, Reich proposed a fund-raising bicycle ride, to raise funds for the Edinburgh Medical Missionary Society and Ravenswood, a Jewish home for the disabled. The original proposal was for 50 people to ride the 400-kilometre (250 mi) northern section of the newly opened Israel National Trail, from Dan in the north of Israel to Beersheba in the Negev. The eventual trip in November 1992 had 230 participants, and raised £600,000.

The sum raised and the enthusiasm it created resulted in Classic Tours being approached by other charities to undertake similar events. Classic Tours operated more than 100 events each year, offering events based on activities as varied as trekking, mountain climbing, and horse riding. The events were arranged as either bespoke challenges for specific charities, consortiums with groups of charities, or open challenges available for anyone to join. The events in 17 years of operations inspired more than 50,000 people to raise £90m via overseas trips.

In 2008, as chairman of the Association of Jewish Refugees' Kindertransport group, he organised celebrations marking 70 years since Parliament allowed the Jewish youngsters into Britain.

Reich was honorary president of Manna, the British branch of the Israeli charity Meir Panim.

== Personal life and death ==
Reich was married four times and had five children from the first three marriages. His fourth wife was Linda Haase. He died on 2 November 2022, aged 87.

== Awards ==
Kindertransport – The Arrival

Reich was recognised with an outstanding contribution award at the 2008 Professional Fundraising Awards. He was knighted for his charitable contributions in the 2010 New Year Honours.

The smallest boy of the 2006 statue Kindertransport – The Arrival in London, commemorating the arrival of Jewish refugees at the city's Liverpool Street station, was modelled on Reich.
