= Yanxi Liu =

Chinese-American computer scientist

Yanxi Liu (Chinese: 劉燕西) is a Chinese-American computer scientist specializing in computer vision. She is known for her research on computational symmetry, computational regularity, and the uses of symmetry and regularity in computer vision, as well as on feature selection for motion tracking. She is a professor of computer science at Pennsylvania State University, where she directs the Motion Capture Lab for Smart Health and co-directs the Lab for Perception, Action and Cognition.

== Education and career ==
Liu has a bachelor's degree from Beijing Normal University. She earned a Ph.D. at the University of Massachusetts Amherst, in 1990. Her dissertation, Symmetry Groups in Robotic Assembly Planning, was supervised by Robin Popplestone.

After postdoctoral research at LIFIA/IMAG, part of the Laboratoire d'Informatique de Grenoble in Grenoble, France, and at DIMACS at Rutgers University, she became a research assistant professor at the University of Massachusetts Amherst in 1993. She moved to the Robotics Institute of Carnegie Mellon University in 1996, as a research scientist, and worked there for ten years before moving to Pennsylvania State University.

== Book ==
With Hagit Hel-Or, Craig S. Kaplan, and Luc Van Gool, Liu is the coauthor of the book Computational Symmetry in Computer Vision and Computer Graphics (Now Publishing, 2009).

== Recognition ==
Liu was a keynote speaker at DICTA 2016, and the program chair of the 2017 Conference on Computer Vision and Pattern Recognition (CVPR).
