= Michael J. C. Gordon =

British computer scientist

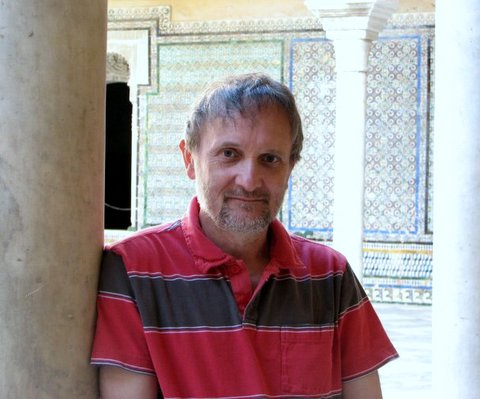
- Born: 28 February 1948; Ripon, Yorkshire, England
- Died: 22 August 2017 (aged 69); Cambridge, England
- Education: Gonville and Caius College, Cambridge; University of Edinburgh
- Known for: HOL theorem prover
- Scientific career
- Fields: Computer Science
- Workplaces: Stanford University; University of Cambridge
- Thesis: Evaluation and denotation of pure LISP programs: a worked example in semantics (1973)
- Doctoral advisor: Rod Burstall

Michael John Caldwell Gordon FRS (28 February 1948 – 22 August 2017) was a British computer scientist.

== Life ==
Mike Gordon was born in Ripon, Yorkshire, England. He attended Dartington Hall School and Bedales School. In 1966, he was accepted to study engineering at Gonville and Caius College, Cambridge, but transferred to mathematics. During his studies, in 1969 he worked at the National Physical Laboratory in London during the summer, gaining his first exposure to computers.

Gordon studied for his PhD degree at the University of Edinburgh, supervised by Rod Burstall, finishing in 1973 with a thesis entitled Evaluation and Denotation of Pure LISP Programs. He was invited to Stanford University in California by John McCarthy, the inventor of LISP, to work in his Artificial Intelligence Laboratory there. Gordon worked at the Cambridge University Computer Laboratory from 1981, initially as a lecturer, promoted to Reader in 1988 and Professor in 1996.

He was elected a Fellow of the Royal Society in 1994, and in 2008 a two-day research meeting on Tools and Techniques for Verification of System Infrastructure was held there in honour of his 60th birthday.

Mike Gordon was married to Avra Cohn, a PhD student of Robin Milner at the University of Edinburgh, and they undertook research together.

He died in Cambridge after a brief illness and is survived by his wife and two sons.

== Work ==
Gordon led the development of the HOL theorem prover. The HOL system is an environment for interactive theorem proving in a higher-order logic. Its most outstanding feature is its high degree of programmability through the meta-language ML. The system has a wide variety of uses, from formalising pure mathematics to the verification of industrial hardware.

There has been a series of international conferences on the HOL system, TPHOLs. The first three were informal users' meetings with no published proceedings. The tradition now is for an annual conference on a different continent from the location of the previous meeting. From 1996, the scope broadened to cover all theorem proving in higher-order logics.
