= Robin Popplestone =

British computer scientist (1938–2004)

Robin John Popplestone
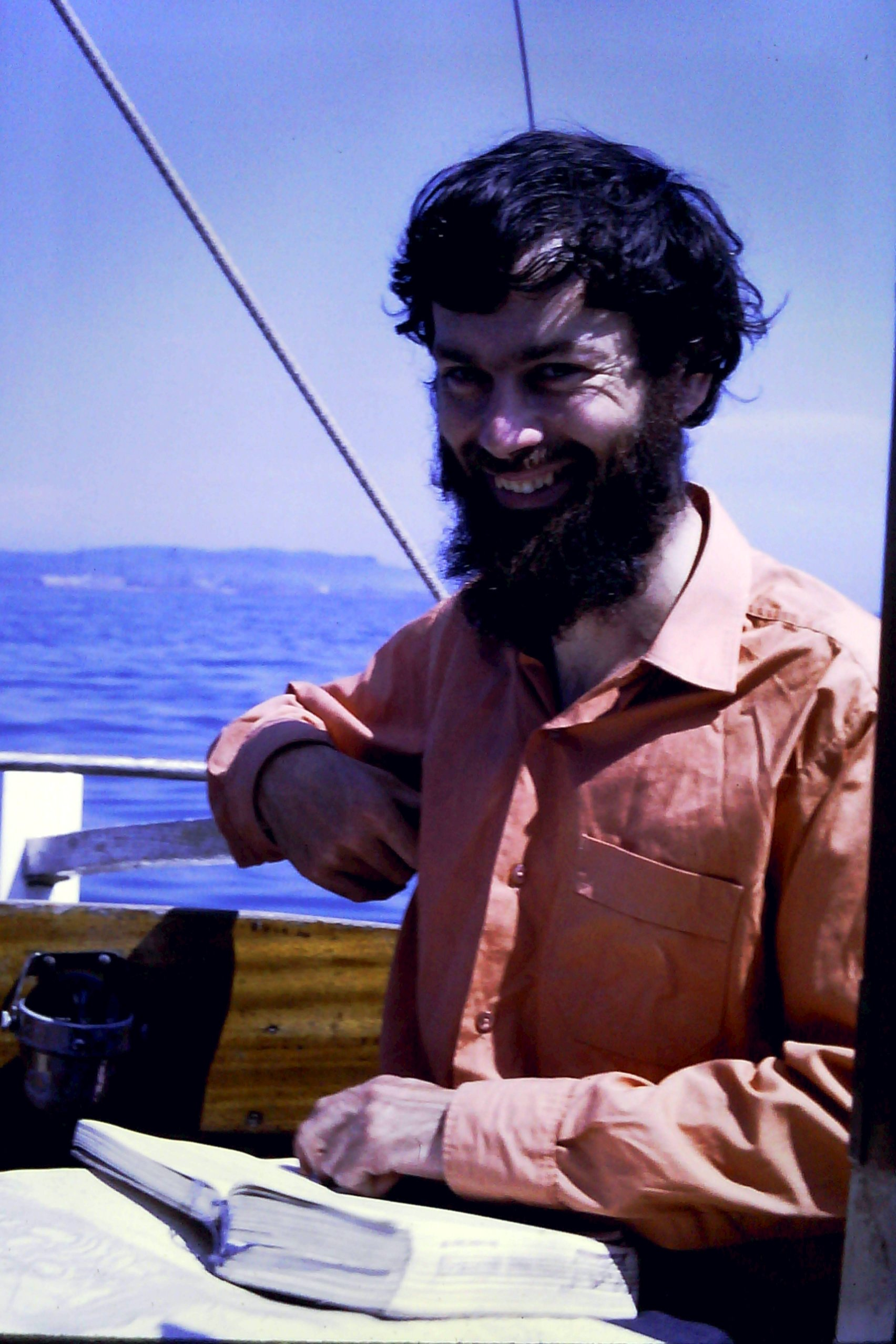
- Robin Popplestone on his yacht in Firth of Forth. August 1969.
- Born: 9 December 1938; Bristol, England, UK
- Died: 14 April 2004 (aged 65); Glasgow, Scotland, UK
- Education: Queen's University Belfast, University of Manchester, University of Leeds
- Known for: COWSEL (POP-1), POP-2, POP-11, Poplog; Freddy II
- Scientific career
- Fields: Computer science, artificial intelligence, robotics
- Institutions: University of Edinburgh, University of Massachusetts Amherst
- Doctoral students: Yanxi Liu

Robin John Popplestone (9 December 1938 in Bristol – 14 April 2004 in Glasgow) was a pioneer in the fields of machine intelligence and robotics. He is known for developing the POP programming languages COWSEL (renamed POP-1), POP-2 (with Rod Burstall), POP-11, the related multi-language integrated development environment Poplog, and for his work on the Freddy II robot with Pat Ambler at the University of Edinburgh Artificial Intelligence laboratory.

== Biography ==
Robin Popplestone was born in Bristol in 1938. After World War II his family moved to Belfast. He received an honours degree in mathematics from Queen's University Belfast in 1960. He started a PhD at the University of Manchester before moving to the University of Leeds. His project was to develop a program for automated theorem proving, but he got caught up in using the university computer to design a boat. He built the boat and set sail for the University of Edinburgh, where he had been offered a research position. A storm hit while crossing the North Sea, and the boat sank. A widely believed story about Popplestone was that he never completed his PhD in mathematics because he lost his thesis manuscript in the boat, although Popplestone refused to corroborate this. The early part of his professional career was spent at the University of Edinburgh (1965–1985) and the later part at the University of Massachusetts Amherst (1985–2001). In 1990, he was elected a Founding Fellow of the Association for the Advancement of Artificial Intelligence. Due to illness, he retired in 2001 to the Glasgow area. He died on 14 April 2004 after a 10-year illness with prostate cancer.
