= William Cole (musician) =

English conductor, composer and organist

William Charles Cole LVO, DMus, FSA, FRAM, FRCM, FRCO (9 October 1909 in Camberwell, London – 9 May 1997) was an English conductor, composer and organist.

Cole went to Saint Olave's Grammar School, where he in fact almost lost his scholarship there because 'his music was getting in the way of his studies'. He also studied at the Royal Academy of Music in London, where he won the Stewart Macpherson Prize in 1933. His appointment in 1930 as organist at St Martin's Church, Dorking and music master at Dorking County School a year later, led to his conducting local choirs at the neighbouring Leith Hill Musical Festival, founded by Ralph Vaughan Williams. The two became close friends and Vaughan Williams played the organ at Cole's first marriage in 1933.

The war years were spent at the Air Ministry, though he continued his choral conducting in his spare time, and in 1945 he succeeded to the Chair of Harmony and Composition at the Royal Academy of Music where he remained until 1962. While there, he directed the People's Palace Choral Society from 1947 to 1963 and succeeded Vaughan Williams as conductor of the Leith Hill Festival in 1954. By this time, Cole was an authority on the composer's music, having worked with him since pre-war days and been his assistant since 1947 - conducting the works that were not to Vaughan Williams' liking - and for the next twenty-three years the Festival went from strength to strength under Cole's leadership. He will, however, be best remembered in musical circles for his work as Master of the Music at the Queen's Chapel of the Savoy from 1954 to 1994; during forty years of sustained work he trained the Savoy choir (the choirboys are also provided by Saint Olave's Grammar School) and composed many pieces for them - a Te Deum, Lord's Prayer and State Prayers (of which copies still exist in his handwriting), not to mention 'A Prelude on While Shepherd's Watched' for organ. He also gave an annual Bach organ recital, and this recital, along with two others, continues at the Savoy every summer.

Outside of music, Cole's main interest was stained glass, and largely as a result of his expertise in this field he was elected a Fellow of the Society of Antiquaries (FSA) in 1979. In 1993 he published a book entitled A Catalogue of Netherlandish and North European Roundels in Britain.

== Writings ==
- The Form of Music
- The Rudiments of Music
- Questions and Exercises on Theory of Music (a series of eight student workbooks built around the syllabus for the eight grades of theory examinations of the Associated Board)
- Selected and edited, Folk Songs of England, Ireland, Scotland and Wales, arranged for piano and guitar by Norman Monath, with illustrations by Edward Ardizzone (New York: Doubleday & Company, Inc., 1961).
