= Michael Colborne =

Michael Melville Colborne LVO (20 January 1934 – 21 September 2017) was born in Epsom, Surrey and attended school at Dorking County Grammar School. was a Royal Navy officer and private secretary to Charles, Prince of Wales, and later the Duke of Westminster.
