= Hagit Hel-Or =

Israeli computer scientist

Hagit Zabrodsky Hel-Or
- חגית הל-אור
- Education: Hebrew University of Jerusalem
- Known for: Image processing, computer vision, symmetry in pattern matching and computational chemistry
- Notable work: Computational Symmetry in Computer Vision and Computer Graphics
- Scientific career
- Fields: Computer Science
- Workplaces: University of Haifa
- Doctoral advisor: Shmuel Peleg

Hagit Zabrodsky Hel-Or (Hebrew: חגית הל-אור) is an Israeli computer scientist known for her research in image processing, computer vision, and the applications of symmetry to pattern matching and computational chemistry. She is a faculty member in the computer science department at the University of Haifa.

== Education and career ==
Hel-Or graduated from the Hebrew University of Jerusalem in 1985, earned a master's degree there in 1989, and completed her Ph.D. there in 1994, with a dissertation supervised by Shmuel Peleg.

After postdoctoral research at Bar-Ilan University and Stanford University, she returned to Bar-Ilan University in 1997 as a lecturer. She moved to the University of Haifa as a senior lecturer in 1998.

== Book ==
With Yanxi Liu, Craig S. Kaplan, and Luc Van Gool, Hel-Or is the coauthor of the book Computational Symmetry in Computer Vision and Computer Graphics (Now Publishing, 2009).
