= Pat Fothergill =

English roboticist

- Born: Ann Patricia Waddington; 13 February 1936; Woodford Wells, Essex, England
- Died: 28 January 2017 (aged 80); Stonehaven, Scotland
- Education: Cambridge University
- Known for: Freddy II; RAPT programming language
- Spouse(s): Richard Ambler (div. 1990); John Fothergill
- Children: 3
- Scientific career
- Fields: Robotics; Programming languages
- Workplaces: University of Edinburgh; University of Aberdeen

Ann Patricia "Pat" Fothergill (née Waddington, formerly Ambler; 13 February 1936 – 28 January 2017) was a pioneer in robotics and robot control languages in the AI department of the University of Edinburgh. She moved to the University of Aberdeen in 1986 to join the Department of Computing as a senior lecturer, where she remained until her death.

== Early life and education ==
Pat Fothergill was born in Woodford Wells, Essex, England in 1936 to an English father Leonard and a Welsh mother Sarah (née Kinton). During her early childhood, her family moved to Singapore and then to South Africa to accommodate her father's career as a civil engineer. She attended Dorking County Grammar School, where she was a Prefect and received the Governors' Prize for her academic achievements. She excelled in math and science, studying Pure Mathematics, Applied Mathematics, Physics, and Chemistry for her A-Level exams. She received distinction in Pure Mathematics and a State Scholarship from the UK Ministry of Education to attend Newnham College, Cambridge.

While at Cambridge, she studied for the Natural Sciences Tripos, specialising in Chemistry, Physics, Biological Chemistry and Mathematics. She also studied for the Archaeological and Anthropological Tripos. She graduated with a BA in 1957 and an MA in 1961.

== Career ==
Following graduation, Fothergill remained at Cambridge with her first husband Richard Ambler, who was then a graduate student in biological sciences, and worked as the information officer for the organic chemistry department with Alexander R. Todd.

She joined the AI laboratory at the University of Edinburgh in 1968 as a research scientist. She helped develop the robot command language RAPT, and worked with Robin Popplestone and Rod Burstall amongst others.

Whilst at Aberdeen, Pat co-authored the paper "WPFM: the Workspace Prediction and Fast Matching Algorithm" with Jonathan C Aylett and Robert B Fisher. This was later included in John E. W. Mayhew and John P. Frisby's "3D Model Recognition From Stereoscopic Cues"
