= Ned Ambler =

American filmmaker and photographer

Ned Ambler (born 1968 or 1969) is an American fine artist, actor and a talent scout who has found models for advertising campaigns for Calvin Klein and Gap.

Ambler attended a boarding school in Connecticut. From 1987 he attended New York University Film School and worked part-time. While working odd jobs for L'Uomo Vogue in 1993 he was asked to find ten street children; this was the beginning of his job as talent scout. Ambler specializes in the "new realism" style, finding his models on the streets or in clubs and bars in New York. He has worked with photographers Richard Avedon, Steven Meisel and Steven Klein. He supplied the models for the 1995 cK Be advertisement campaign that helped make it the best selling perfume in the United States.

By 1999 Ambler's work as talent scout had become less intense; he branched out into photography and worked on a book and filmmaking. In 2011 he began working as an illustrator and art director, 2011
