= Richard Charles Ambler =

American politician

Richard Charles Ambler (August 31, 1853 – September 12, 1891) was an American politician.

Ambler, the son of Charles and Mary (Curtiss) Ambler, of Nichol's Farms, in the township of Trumbull, Connecticut, was born on August 31, 1853. He graduated from Yale Law School in 1878. In the autumn after graduation he entered the law office of Seymour & Seymour, in Bridgeport, Connecticut, where he remained for two years. He then opened an office for himself in Bridgeport, and built up gradually a good business. He was a representative in the Connecticut General Assembly from the town of Trumbull (where his residence continued) in 1889, and frequently represented the parish of which he was a vestryman in the annual convention of the Episcopal diocese. He was interested in historical research, and served as an officer of the Fairfield County Historical Society from the time of its organization After an illness of six months, which had not, however, prevented him from continuing at work, he died at his home in Trumbull, from meningitis of the brain, on September 12, 1891, at the age of 38.

He was married on October 1, 1879, to Jennie M., daughter of Stephen Beardsley, of Huntington, Connecticut, who with one daughter survived him.
