= R. Kent Dybvig =

American computer scientist

Professor R. Kent Dybvig
- Citizenship: United States
- Education: PhD, UNC Chapel Hill, 1987; MS, Indiana University Bloomington, 1983; BA, Indiana University Bloomington, 1980
- Known for: Chez Scheme
- Awards: ACM Distinguished Engineer
- Scientific career
- Fields: Computer science; Programming languages
- Institutions: Indiana University Bloomington; Cadence Research Systems; Cisco Systems

R. Kent Dybvig is a professor emeritus of computer science at Indiana University Bloomington, in Bloomington, Indiana. His research focuses on programming languages, and he is the principal developer of the optimizing Chez Scheme compiler and runtime system which were initially released in 1985. Together with Daniel P. Friedman, he has long advocated the use of the Scheme language in teaching computer science. He retired from Indiana University to join Cisco in 2011.

For his contributions to both the practical and theoretical aspects of computing and information technology, in particular his design and development of Chez Scheme, the Association for Computing Machinery named Dybvig a Distinguished Member in 2006, the first year the association awarded distinguished ranks.

== Books ==
- Dybvig, R. Kent (2009). The Scheme Programming Language, 4th edition. Cambridge, Massachusetts: MIT Press. ISBN 978-0-262-51298-5.
