= Poplog =

Software development environment

- Original authors: Robin Popplestone, Steve Hardy, Chris Mellish, Aaron Sloman, John Williams, Robert Duncan, Simon Nichols, John Gibson
- Developers: University of Sussex; Systems Designers Ltd. Integral Solutions Ltd. University of Birmingham
- Release: 1982; 44 years ago
- Stable release: 16 / January 2020; 6 years ago
- Written in: POP-11
- Operating system: Cross-platform: VMS, Unix, Linux, Mac OS X, Windows
- Platform: VAX, SPARC, IA-32, PowerPC, x86-64
- Size: 17+ MB
- Available in: English
- Type: IDE
- License: Proprietary (1982–1999); Open-source (1999–present): MIT–XFree86
- Website: www.cs.bham.ac.uk/research/projects/poplog/poplog.info.html
- Repository: getpoplog.github.io

Poplog is a reflective, incrementally compiled software development computer programming integrated development environment and system platform for the programming languages POP-11, Common Lisp, Prolog, and Standard ML. It was created originally in the United Kingdom for teaching and research in artificial intelligence, at the University of Sussex, and later marketed as a commercial package for software development, teaching, and research. It was one of the initiatives supported for a time by the UK government-funded Alvey Programme.

It was licensed originally from 1982 to 1999, as proprietary software, then released in 1999 as open-source software, under a mix of MIT and then XFree86 licenses.

== History ==
After an incremental compiler for Prolog had been added to an implementation of POP-11, the name POPLOG was adopted, to reflect that the expanded system supported programming in both languages. The name was retained, as a trade mark of the University of Sussex, when the system was later (mid 1980s) extended with incremental compilers for Common Lisp and Standard ML based on a set of tools for implementing new languages in the Poplog Virtual Machine. The user-accessible incremental-compiler tools that allow compilers for all these languages to be added also allow extensions to be made within a language to provide new abilities that cannot be added via standard macros that merely allow new text to be equivalent to a longer portion of old text.

For some time after 1983, Poplog was sold and supported internationally as a commercial product, on behalf of the University of Sussex by Systems Designers Ltd (SDL), whose name changed as ownership changed. The main development work continued to be done by a small team at Sussex University until 1998, while marketing, sales, and support (except for UK academic users, who dealt directly with the Sussex team) was done by SDL and its successors (SD, then SD-Scicon then Electronic Data Systems (EDS)) until 1991. At that time a management buy-out produced a spin-off company Integral Solutions Ltd (ISL), to sell and support Poplog in collaboration with Sussex University, who retained the rights to the name 'Poplog' and were responsible for the core software development while it was a commercial product. In 1992 ISL and Sussex University won a "Smart Award" in recognition of Poplog sales worth $5M. ISL and its clients used Poplog for many development projects, especially ISL's data-mining system Clementine, mostly implemented in POP-11, using powerful graphical tools implemented also in POP-11 running on the X Window System. Clementine was so successful that in 1998 ISL was bought by SPSS Inc who had been selling the statistics and data-mining package SPSS for which they needed a better graphical interface suited to expert and non-expert users. SPSS did not wish to sell and support Poplog as such, so Poplog then became available as a free open source software package, hosted at the University of Birmingham, which had also been involved in development after 1991. Later IBM bought SPSS and Clementine is now marketed and supported as SPSS Modeler.

== Supported languages ==
Poplog's core language is POP-11. It is used to implement the other languages, all of them incrementally compiled, with an integrated common editor. In the Linux/Unix versions, POP-11 provides support for 2-D graphics via X.

Poplog supports incrementally compiled versions of Common Lisp, POP-11, Prolog, and Standard ML. A separate package implemented by Robin Popplestone supports a version of Scheme.

Poplog has been used both for academic research and teaching in artificial intelligence and also to develop several commercial products, apart from Clementine. In 1992, ISL and Sussex University won an ICP Million Dollar award in recognition of Poplog exceeding sales of US$5 million.

== Platforms ==
POP-11 was at first implemented on a DEC PDP-11 computer in 1976, and was ported to VAX/VMS in 1980. It became Poplog around 1982. Although the first commercial sales were for VAX/VMS, from the mid-1980s, the main Poplog development work was done on Sun SPARC computers running Solaris, although several different versions were sold, including versions for HP-UX and a 64-bit version of Poplog for DEC Alpha running Digital UNIX. After about 1999, when Poplog became available as free, open source, most development work was done on the Linux version, including porting to 64-bit Linux. A partial port to Mac OS X on PowerPC was done in 2005.

There is a version for Windows, originally developed to support Clementine, but the Unix/Linux graphical subsystem does not work on Windows Poplog. The Windows version of Clementine depended on a commercial package that supported X functionality on Windows.

There is also an open source project which aimed to produce a more platform neutral version of Poplog, including Windows. The most recent development by this project includes a web server component for integrating into Poplog applications, and the OpenPoplog Widget Collection for supporting client user interfaces running in a web browser. A more narrowly focused open source Poplog project, restricted to the 64-bit AMD64/X86-64 architecture was set up on GitHub by Waldek Hebisch: . This is now the basis of Poplog Version 16 hosted at the University of Birmingham .

Additional information about the history and features of Poplog can be found in the entries for POP-2 and POP-11. The chief architect of Poplog, responsible for many innovations related to making an incrementally compiled system portable, and providing support for a collection of languages was John Gibson, at Sussex University, though the earliest work was done by Steve Hardy. Chris Mellish helped with the initial Prolog implementation in POP-11. John Williams, working under supervision of Jonathan Cunningham implemented the Common Lisp subsystem. Robert Duncan and Simon Nichols added Standard ML. Between about 1980 and 1991, the project was managed by Aaron Sloman, until he went to the University of Birmingham, though he continued to collaborate with Sussex and ISL on Poplog development after that. Since 1999, he has been responsible for the main Poplog website, and some of the extensions hosted there, listed under POP-11.

== Implementation ==
The Prolog subset of Poplog is implemented using the extendable incremental compiler of POP-11, the core language of Poplog, which is a general purpose Lisp-like language with a more conventional syntax. The implementation required the Poplog Virtual Machine to be extended to provide support for Prolog continuations, Prolog variables, the Prolog trail (recording undoable variable bindings), and Prolog terms. The implementation was constrained by the need to allow data-structures to be shared with the other Poplog languages, especially POP-11 and Common Lisp, thereby providing support for a mixture of programming styles.
