= Richard Ambler =

English molecular biologist

Richard Penry Ambler
- Born: 26 May 1933; Bexleyheath, London, England
- Died: 27 December 2013 (aged 80); Edinburgh, Scotland
- Education: Pembroke College, Cambridge
- Occupation: Molecular biologist
- Known for: Research into antibiotic resistance and protein sequencing

Richard Penry Ambler (26 May 1933 – 27 December 2013) was an English molecular biologist who conducted groundbreaking research into the evolution of antibiotic-resistant bacteria. Ambler was the first scientist to publish an amino acid sequence of a bacterial protein, and had a long academic career at the University of Edinburgh.

== Early life and education ==
Ambler was born on 26 May 1933 in Bexleyheath, London to Anne Evans, a civil servant, and Henry Ambler, a state-employed chemist. In 1940, the family moved to Pune, India, where Ambler's father conducted wartime explosives research. Ambler later returned to England to attend boarding school at Haileybury, before heading to Pembroke College, Cambridge in 1954 to study natural sciences. He remained at Cambridge to complete his PhD on bacterial proteins, under the tutelage of the Nobel Prize-winning scientist Fred Sanger. In 1963, Ambler published the first amino acid sequence of a bacterial protein, developing new methods of protein sequencing to determine the structure of the mitochondrial cytochrome c protein. Cytochrome c remains an important object of study for modern biologists.

== Academic career and bacterial research ==
In 1965, Ambler joined the newly created Department of Molecular Biology at the University of Edinburgh. He began a longstanding research project on the increasing resistance of certain bacteria to penicillin and other antibiotics, making important discoveries related to bacterial gene transfer and enzyme development. In particular, Ambler found that horizontal gene transfer played a key role in the development of antibiotic resistance.

Ambler continued to sequence bacterial electron-transfer proteins, primarily Cytochrome C and Rubredoxin from photosynthetic and other bacteria throughout his career and made significant contributions to bacterial phylogenetics. Ambler was particularly interested in the potential for the wider significance of horizontal gene transfer in evolution, influencing Carl Woese's later perspective.

He headed the Department of Molecular Biology between 1984 and 1990, helping to reorganize it into more specialized sub-departments, and became a member of the European Molecular Biology Organisation in 1985. He retired from the University of Edinburgh in the mid-1990s, and died in Edinburgh in December 2013.

== Personal life ==
Ambler was married twice, first to roboticist Pat Waddington and later to Susan Hewlett. He was survived by two daughters, four step-daughters and seven grandchildren. He had a keen interest in archeology, and was a fellow of the Society of Antiquaries of Scotland.
