= MLton =

- Paradigm: Multi-paradigm: functional, imperative
- Family: ML: Standard ML
- First appeared: 1997; 28 years ago
- Stable release: 20241230 / December 30, 2024; 2 months ago
- Typing discipline: strong, static, inferred
- License: Historical Permission Notice and Disclaimer
- Filename extensions: .sml
- Website: mlton.org

Influenced by
- Standard ML

MLton is a whole-program optimizing compiler for the programming language Standard ML. MLton development began in 1997, and continues (Note: https://github.com/MLton/mlton) with a worldwide community of developers and users, who have helped to port MLton to several computing platforms. It is free and open-source software released under a Historical Permission Notice and Disclaimer. MLton was a participating organization in the 2013 Google Summer of Code.

MLton aims to produce fast executables, and to encourage rapid prototyping and modular programming by eliminating inefficiencies often associated with high-level features. It also aims to facilitate large-scale programming through the MLBasis system, (Note: http://mlton.org/MLBasis) simplifying modularity and management of namespaces. As a whole-program compiler, it is notable for lacking an read–eval–print loop interactive top-level, common among Standard ML environments. (Note: http://mlton.org/Drawbacks)

MLton includes several libraries in addition to the Basis standard library including ML Language Processing Tools with an implementation of ANTLR, and MLRISC with code generators for reduced instruction set computers. It also implements features that aid in porting code from SML/NJ, one of the more popular SML implementations, including support for SML/NJ's compiling manager.

== See also ==
- NEC Corporation of America § NEC Research Institute
