= Roy Ambler =

English footballer

Personal information
- Full name: Roy Ambler
- Date of birth: 2 December 1937
- Place of birth: Wakefield, England
- Date of death: 5 May 2007 (aged 69)
- Place of death: Leeds, England
- Position: Inside forward

Youth career
- –1954: Outwood Stormcocks

Senior career*
Years	Team	Apps	(Gls)
1954–1959	Leeds United	0	(0)
1959–1961	Shrewsbury Town	29	(8)
1961–1962	Wrexham	21	(13)
1962–1963	York City	12	(3)
1963	Southport	11	(0)
- Matlock Town
- * Club domestic league appearances and goals

Roy Ambler (2 December 1937 – 5 May 2007) was an English footballer who played for Leeds United, Shrewsbury Town, Wrexham, York City, Southport and Matlock Town.
