= Aaron Sloman =

Zimbabwean-born AI researcher (born 1936)

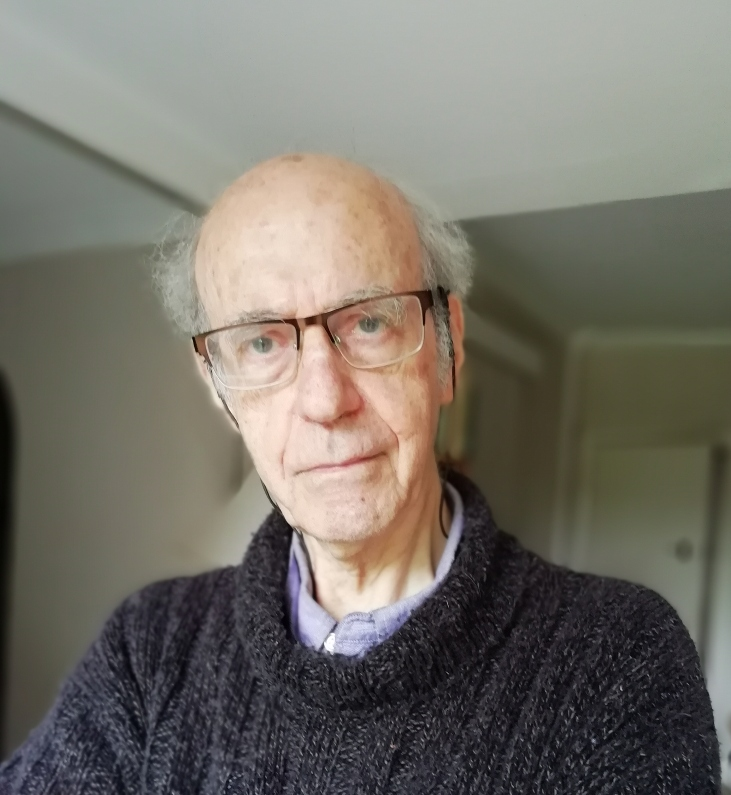
- Aaron Sloman in 2020
- Born: October 30, 1936; Que Que, Southern Rhodesia

Academic background
- Education: University of Oxford
- Doctoral advisor: David Pears
- Other advisor: Hao Wang

Academic work
- Institutions: University of Sussex; University of Birmingham

Aaron Sloman (born 1936) is a philosopher and researcher on artificial intelligence and cognitive science. He held the Chair in Artificial Intelligence and Cognitive Science at the School of Computer Science at the University of Birmingham, and before that a chair with the same title at the University of Sussex. Since retiring he is Honorary Professor of Artificial Intelligence and Cognitive Science at Birmingham. He has published widely on philosophy of mathematics, epistemology, cognitive science, and artificial intelligence; he also collaborated widely, e.g. with biologist Jackie Chappell on the evolution of intelligence.

== Early life and education ==
Sloman was born in 1936, in the town of Que Que (now called Kwekwe), in what was then Southern Rhodesia (now Zimbabwe). His parents were Lithuanian Jews who emigrated to Southern Rhodesia around the turn of the century. Sloman describes himself as an atheist. He went to school in Cape Town between 1948 and 1953, then earned a degree in Mathematics and Physics at the University of Cape Town in 1956, after which a Rhodes Scholarship (from South African College School) took him to the University of Oxford (first Balliol College, and then St Antony's College). In Oxford, he became interested in philosophy after a brief period studying mathematical logic supervised by Hao Wang, eventually writing a DPhil in philosophy, defending the ideas of Immanuel Kant about the nature of mathematical knowledge as non-empirical and non-analytic (Knowing and Understanding, 1962).

== Career ==
His first job was teaching philosophy at the University of Hull (1962–64), after which he moved to Sussex University where he worked on philosophy of mind, philosophy of science, meta-ethics, and various topics in epistemology. In 1969, he learned about artificial intelligence (AI) from Max Clowes, then a leading UK AI researcher in vision. As a result of this, he published a paper distinguishing analogical representations from Fregean representations and criticising the logicist approach to AI as too narrow. It was presented at IJCAI in 1971, then reprinted in Artificial Intelligence.

Subsequently, he was invited by Bernard Meltzer to spend a year (1972–1973) in Edinburgh University where he met and worked with many leading AI researchers. When he went back to Sussex, he helped to found what eventually grew into COGS, the School of Cognitive and Computing Sciences. He managed the Poplog development team between 1980 and 1991.

While at Sussex University he published "The Computer Revolution in Philosophy: Philosophy science and models of mind" (which emphasised the importance of architectures) in 1978, and other papers on various aspects of philosophy and AI, including work on the analysis of 'ought' and 'better', on vision on emotions in robots, on forms of representation and other topics. Much of his energy was devoted to developing new kinds of teaching materials based on POP-11 and Poplog for students learning AI and cognitive science.

In 1991, after 27 years at Sussex, he was offered a research chair in the School of Computer Science at the University of Birmingham, where he started a cognition and affect project (later on the Free Open Source Poplog Portal) and is still on it. He retired in 2001, but continues working full-time.

== Influences ==
His philosophical ideas were deeply influenced by the writings of Immanuel Kant, Gottlob Frege and Karl Popper, and to a lesser extent by John Austin, Gilbert Ryle, R. M. Hare (who, as his 'personal tutor' at Balliol College, discussed meta-ethics with him), Imre Lakatos and Ludwig Wittgenstein. What he could learn from philosophers left large gaps, which he decided around 1970 research in artificial intelligence might fill. E.g. philosophy of mind could be transformed by testing ideas in working fragments of minds, and philosophy of mathematics could be illuminated by trying to understand how a working robot could develop into a mathematician.

Much of his thinking about AI was influenced by Marvin Minsky and despite his critique of logicism, he also learnt much from John McCarthy. His work on emotions can be seen as an elaboration of a paper on "Motivational and emotional controls of cognition", written in the 1960s by Herbert A. Simon. He disagrees with all of these on some topics, while agreeing on others.

== Recognition ==
He is a Fellow of Association for the Advancement of Artificial Intelligence, Society for the Study of Artificial Intelligence and the Simulation of Behaviour and European Coordinating Committee for Artificial Intelligence. In 2018, he became a Fellow of the Alan Turing Institute. Sussex University awarded him an honorary Doctorate of Science in July 2006. The Sloman Lounge in the School of Computer Science at the University of Birmingham is named in his honour. In 2020 the American Philosophical Association (APA) awarded him the K.Jon Barwise Prize "for significant and sustained contributions to areas relevant to philosophy and computing".

== Selected publications ==
- A. Sloman, Knowing and Understanding: Relations between meaning and truth, meaning and necessary truth, meaning and synthetic necessary truth, Oxford University DPhil Thesis, 1962 (digitised 2007, Oxford Research Archive), also available with detailed table of contents in html here.
- A. Sloman, How to derive "Better" from "is", American Phil. Quarterly, 6, pp. 43–52, 1969.
- A. Sloman, Interactions between philosophy and AI: The role of intuition and non-logical reasoning in intelligence,Proc 2nd IJCAI, 1971, London. (Reprinted in 'Artificial Intelligence', vol 2, 3–4, pp 209–225, 1971, and in J.M. Nicholas, ed. Images, Perception, and knowledge, Dordrecht-Holland: Reidel. 1977.)
- A. Sloman, The Computer Revolution in Philosophy: Philosophy, science and models of mind, Harvester press and Humanities press, 1978. (Out of print but now online)
- A. Sloman and M. Croucher, 'Why robots will have emotions', Proc 7th IJCAI, 1981, pp. 197–202, Vancouver.
- A. Sloman, The structure of the space of possible minds, in The Mind and the Machine: philosophical aspects of Artificial Intelligence, Ed. S. Torrance, Ellis Horwood, 1984, Chichester, Sloman-possible-minds
- A. Sloman, What enables a machine to understand?, in Proc 9th IJCAI, Los Angeles, pp. 995–1001, 1985
- Online presentations
- A. Sloman, Reference without causal links, Eds. J.B.H. du Boulay, D.Hogg and L.Steels, Advances in Artificial Intelligence – II, Dordrecht, North Holland, pp. 369–381, 1987
- A. Sloman, Did Searle attack strong strong or weak strong AI, Eds. A.G. Cohn and J.R. Thomas, Artificial Intelligence and Its Applications, John Wiley and Sons, 1986
- A. Sloman, On designing a visual system: Towards a Gibsonian computational model of vision, in Journal of Experimental and Theoretical AI, 1, 4, pp. 289–337, 1989
- A. Sloman and R.L. Chrisley, Virtual machines and consciousness, in Journal of Consciousness Studies, 10, 4–5, pp. 113–172, 2003.
- A. Sloman and J. Chappell, The Altricial-Precocial Spectrum for Robots, in Proceedings IJCAI'05, Edinburgh, pp. 1187–1192, 2005.
- J.Chappell and A. Sloman, Natural and artificial meta-configured altricial information-processing systems, in Int. Journal of Unconventional Computing, 3,3, pp. 211–239, 2007.

== See also ==
- Cognitive architecture
