= Standard ML of New Jersey =

Free software implementation of the ML language

- Paradigms: Multi-paradigm: functional, imperative
- Family: ML: Standard ML
- Developers: Bell Laboratories, Princeton University; Lucent Technologies, Yale University (FLINT Project), AT&T Research
- First appeared: 1988; 38 years ago
- Stable release: 110.99.4 / 1 August 2023; 2 years ago
- Typing discipline: strong, static, inferred
- Implementation language: Standard ML, C
- License: BSD-like
- Filename extensions: .sml
- Website: www.smlnj.org

Influenced by
- Standard ML

Influenced
- Mythryl

Standard ML of New Jersey (SML/NJ; Standard Meta-Language of New Jersey) is a compiler and integrated development environment for the programming language Standard ML. It is written in Standard ML, except for the runtime system in C language. It was originally developed jointly by Bell Laboratories and Princeton University. It is free and open-source software released under a permissive software license (BSD-like).

Its name is a reference both to the American state of New Jersey in which Princeton and Bell Labs are located, and to Standard Oil of New Jersey, the famous oil monopoly of the early 20th century.

== Features ==
SML/NJ extends the SML'97 Basis Library with several added top-level structures:

- System info – the SysInfo structure provides information about the runtime system, such as the operating system kind, type and version and whether or not the machine supports multiprocessing.
- Weak pointers – the Weak structure provides support for weak pointers.
- Lazy suspensions – the Susp structure implements the suspensions necessary for lazy evaluation (as opposed to eager evaluation).
- Compiler internals – the Internals structure provides access to several of the compiler internals, including methods to instantiate and modify the signal table.
- Unsafe access – the Unsafe structure provides unsafe access to data structures and runtime-system functions.
- Visible compiler structures – SML/NJ also includes structures that provide access to the ML compiler, which contains substructures for execution profiling, control of compiler error-message printing and warnings, and customizable pretty printing.

Also, SML/NJ provides some syntactic constructs that are not standard features of SML'97:

- Vector expressions and patterns – SML/NJ allows the creation of vectors with the #[exp_{0}, exp_{1}, ..., exp_{n}_{−1}] syntax and allows pattern-matching on them with analogous syntax.
- Or-patterns – SML/NJ extends the syntax of SML'97 patterns to allow for a matching multiple patterns in a single rule, provided each pattern has the same type, using (apat_{1} | ... | apat_{n}) => exp .
- Object language embedding – SML/NJ provides the quote/antiquote syntax that permits the embedding of expressions in an object language's concrete syntax within ML expressions and programs.
- Higher-order modules – SML/NJ supports the parametrization of functors by allowing functors to be components of structures, in addition to Standard ML's parametric modules in the form of functors.

== Development ==
Successor ML is a term used to describe the next version of the language. The documents describing it have been extracted from the SML/NJ '97 files and made available as a GitHub repository of TeX documents which the community is expected to collaborate and grow the language. Successor ML features can be enabled using the command-line option -Cparser.succ-ml=true.

Since at least 1998, MLton is the standard bootstrapping compiler, and includes some support for Successor ML.

In 2008, work began on HaMLet, a reference implementation of Successor ML written entirely in Standard ML. As of 2018, HaMLet remains the only complete implementation of Successor ML, with added novel features.

Since 2015, the evolution of SML/NJ geared towards evolving the Basis library and adding support for the Successor ML definition with the release of version 110.79.

At the end of 2020, 64-bit support was added with the release of version 110.99.

== See also ==
- Extended ML
- Dependent ML
