= Don Sannella =

Donald T. Sannella is professor of computer science in the Laboratory for Foundations of Computer Science, at the School of Informatics, University of Edinburgh, Scotland.

Sannella graduated from Yale University, University of California, Berkeley and University of Edinburgh with degrees in computer science. His research interests include: algebraic specification and formal software development, correctness of modular systems, types and functional programming, resource certification for mobile code.

Sannella is founder of the European Joint Conferences on Theory and Practice of Software, a confederation of computer science conferences, held annually in Europe since 1998. He is editor-in-chief of the journal Theoretical Computer Science, and is co-founder and CEO of Contemplate Ltd. His father is Ted Sannella.

== Honours and awards ==
In 2014 Sannella was elected a Fellow of the Royal Society of Edinburgh.
