= Fourth normal form =

Normal form used in database normalization

Fourth normal form (4NF) is a normal form used in database normalization. Introduced by Ronald Fagin in 1977, 4NF is the next level of normalization after Boyce–Codd normal form (BCNF). Whereas the second, third, and Boyce–Codd normal forms are concerned with functional dependencies, 4NF is concerned with a more general type of dependency known as a multivalued dependency. A table is in 4NF if and only if, for every one of its non-trivial multivalued dependencies X $\twoheadrightarrow$ Y, X is a superkey—that is, X is either a candidate key or a superset thereof.

== Multivalued dependencies ==
If the column headings in a relational database table are divided into three disjoint groupings X, Y, and Z, then, in the context of a particular row, we can refer to the data beneath each group of headings as x, y, and z respectively. A multivalued dependency X $\twoheadrightarrow$ Y signifies that if we choose any x actually occurring in the table (call this choice x_{c}), and compile a list of all the x_{c}yz combinations that occur in the table, we will find that x_{c} is associated with the same y entries regardless of z. So essentially the presence of z provides no useful information to constrain the possible values of y.

A trivial multivalued dependency X $\twoheadrightarrow$ Y is one where either Y is a subset of X, or X and Y together form the whole set of attributes of the relation.

A functional dependency is a special case of multivalued dependency. In a functional dependency X → Y, every x determines exactly one y, never more than one.

== Example ==
Consider the following example:

Pizza Delivery Permutations
Restaurant	Pizza variety	Delivery area
A1 Pizza	Thick Crust	Springfield
A1 Pizza	Thick Crust	Shelbyville
A1 Pizza	Thick Crust	Capital City
A1 Pizza	Stuffed Crust	Springfield
A1 Pizza	Stuffed Crust	Shelbyville
A1 Pizza	Stuffed Crust	Capital City
Elite Pizza	Thin Crust	Capital City
Elite Pizza	Stuffed Crust	Capital City
Vincenzo's Pizza	Thick Crust	Springfield
Vincenzo's Pizza	Thick Crust	Shelbyville
Vincenzo's Pizza	Thin Crust	Springfield
Vincenzo's Pizza	Thin Crust	Shelbyville

Each row indicates that a given restaurant can deliver a given variety of pizza to a given area.

The table has no non-key attributes because its only candidate key is {Restaurant, Pizza variety, Delivery area}. Therefore, it meets all normal forms up to BCNF. If we assume, however, that pizza varieties offered by a restaurant are not affected by delivery area, or the converse, that delivery areas are not affected by pizza varieties (i.e. a restaurant offers all pizza varieties it makes to all areas it supplies), then it does not meet 4NF. The problem is that the table features two non-trivial multivalued dependencies on the {Restaurant} attribute (which is not a superkey). The dependencies are:

- {Restaurant} $\twoheadrightarrow$ {Pizza variety}
- {Restaurant} $\twoheadrightarrow$ {Delivery area}

These non-trivial multivalued dependencies on a non-superkey reflect the fact that the varieties of pizza a restaurant offers are independent from the areas to which the restaurant delivers. This state of affairs leads to redundancy in the table: for example, we are told three times that A1 Pizza offers Stuffed Crust, and if A1 Pizza starts producing Cheese Crust pizzas then we will need to add multiple rows, one for each of A1 Pizza's delivery areas. There is, moreover, nothing to prevent us from doing this incorrectly: we might add Cheese Crust rows for all but one of A1 Pizza's delivery areas, thereby failing to respect the multivalued dependency {Restaurant} $\twoheadrightarrow$ {Pizza variety}.

To eliminate the possibility of these anomalies, we must place the facts about varieties offered into a different table from the facts about delivery areas, yielding two tables that are both in 4NF:

Varieties by restaurant
Restaurant	Pizza variety
A1 Pizza	Thick Crust
A1 Pizza	Stuffed Crust
Elite Pizza	Thin Crust
Elite Pizza	Stuffed Crust
Vincenzo's Pizza	Thick Crust
Vincenzo's Pizza	Thin Crust

Delivery areas by restaurant
Restaurant	Delivery area
A1 Pizza	Springfield
A1 Pizza	Shelbyville
A1 Pizza	Capital City
Elite Pizza	Capital City
Vincenzo's Pizza	Springfield
Vincenzo's Pizza	Shelbyville

In contrast, if the pizza varieties offered by a restaurant sometimes did legitimately vary from one delivery area to another, the original three-column table would satisfy 4NF.

Ronald Fagin demonstrated that it is always possible to achieve 4NF. Rissanen's theorem is also applicable to multivalued dependencies.

== 4NF in practice ==
A 1992 paper by Margaret S. Wu notes that the teaching of database normalization typically stops short of 4NF, perhaps because of a belief that tables violating 4NF (but meeting all lower normal forms) are rarely encountered in business applications. This belief may not be accurate, however. Wu reports that in a study of forty organizational databases, over 20% contained one or more tables that violated 4NF while meeting all lower normal forms.

== Normalization beyond 4NF ==
Only in rare situations does a 4NF table not conform to the higher normal form 5NF. These are situations in which a complex real-world constraint governing the valid combinations of attribute values in the 4NF table is not implicit in the structure of that table.

== See also ==
- Attribute-value system
- Bijection
- Injective function
- First normal form (1NF)
- Second normal form (2NF)
- Third normal form (3NF)
- Fifth normal form (5NF)
- Sixth normal form (6NF)
