= Second normal form =

Level of database normalization

Second normal form (2NF) is a level of database normalization defined by English computer scientist Edgar F. Codd. A relation (or a table, in SQL) is in 2NF if it is in first normal form (1NF) and contains no partial dependencies. A partial dependency occurs when a non-prime attribute (that is, one not part of any candidate key) is functionally dependent on only a proper subset of the attributes making up a candidate key. To be in 2NF, a relation must have every non-prime attribute depend on the whole set of attributes of every candidate key.

For instance, a relation with the composite key {Country, District} would violate 2NF if any attribute was added whose values' meanings didn't depend on both the Country and the District to which they applied. A CountryLeader attribute would vary between and provide information specific to each Country but not specific to each District, and would therefore depend on only half of the composite key. This would have several drawbacks, including that any leader would be redundantly duplicated for each District in their Country.

The purpose of normalization to 2NF is to reduce such redundancy and to make a database's structure generally more clear and flexible by organizing it by functional dependencies. 2NF and third normal form (3NF) were both defined in Codd's paper "Further Normalization of the Data Base Relational Model" in 1971, a year after Codd defined 1NF in "A Relational Model of Data for Large Shared Data Banks" in 1970. All normal forms make up part of Codd's relational model of database design.

== Example ==
=== Design which violates 2NF ===
The following relation in first normal form contains a composite key, {Manufacturer, Model}. The non-prime attribute ManufacturerCountry is functionally dependent on the attribute Manufacturer (as each Manufacturer will be associated with a separate ManufacturerCountry), but not on the attribute Model. Thus, ManufacturerCountry depends only on a proper subset of the key, {Manufacturer}, making it only partially dependent on the key and violating 2NF.

Toothbrush
Manufacturer	Model	ManufacturerCountry
Forte	X-Prime	Italy
Forte	Ultraclean	Italy
Dent-o-Fresh	EZbrush	USA
Brushmaster	SuperBrush	USA
Kobayashi	ST-60	Japan
Hoch	Toothmaster	Germany
Hoch	X-Prime	Germany

=== Design which complies with 2NF ===
To bring a relation already in 1NF in line with 2NF, any attributes which depend on only part of a composite key must be extracted to separate relations where the attributes they depend on compose the entirety of a candidate key. As seen below, the attribute ManufacturerCountry can be removed from the original Toothbrush relation and put into a new relation where the attribute Manufacturer makes up the full primary key. The new Country attribute thereby depends on the full key rather than only a part of it, and so the previous partial dependency has become a full dependency, putting both relations in 2NF.

Toothbrush
Manufacturer	Model
Forte	X-Prime
Forte	Ultraclean
Dent-o-Fresh	EZbrush
Brushmaster	SuperBrush
Kobayashi	ST-60
Hoch	Toothmaster
Hoch	X-Prime

Manufacturer
Manufacturer	Country
Forte	Italy
Dent-o-Fresh	USA
Brushmaster	USA
Kobayashi	Japan
Hoch	Germany

== See also ==
- Attribute-value system
- First normal form (1NF)
- Third normal form (3NF)
- Boyce–Codd normal form (BCNF or 3.5NF)
- Fourth normal form (4NF)
- Fifth normal form (5NF)
- Sixth normal form (6NF)
