= Domain-key normal form =

Database form

Domain-key normal form (DK/NF or DKNF) is a normal form used in database normalization which requires that the database contains no constraints other than domain constraints and key constraints.

A domain constraint specifies the permissible values for a given attribute, while a key constraint specifies the attributes that uniquely identify a row in a given table.

The domain/key normal form is achieved when every constraint on the relation is a logical consequence of the definition of keys and domains, and enforcing key and domain restraints and conditions causes all constraints to be met. Thus, it avoids all non-temporal anomalies.

The reason to use domain/key normal form is to avoid having general constraints in the database that are not clear domain or key constraints. Most databases can easily test domain and key constraints on attributes. General constraints however would normally require special database programming in the form of stored procedures (often of the trigger variety) that are expensive to maintain and expensive for the database to execute. Therefore, general constraints are split into domain and key constraints.

It's much easier to build a new database in domain/key normal form than it is to convert from databases on lesser normal forms which may contain numerous anomalies. However, successfully building a domain/key normal form database remains a difficult task, even for experienced database programmers. Thus, while the domain/key normal form eliminates the problems found in most databases, it tends to be the most costly normal form to achieve. However, failing to achieve the domain/key normal form may carry long-term, hidden costs due to anomalies which appear in databases adhering only to lower normal forms over time.

The third normal form, Boyce–Codd normal form, fourth normal form and fifth normal form are special cases of the domain/key normal form. All have either functional, multi-valued or join dependencies that can be converted into superkeys. The domains on those normal forms were unconstrained so all domain constraints are satisfied. However, transforming a higher normal form into domain/key normal form is not always a dependency-preserving transformation and therefore not always possible.

== Example ==
A violation of DKNF occurs in the following table:

Wealthy Person
Wealthy Person	Wealthy Person Type	Net Worth in Dollars
Steve	Millionaire	124,543,621
Roderick	Billionaire	6,553,228,893
Katrina	Billionaire	8,829,462,998
Gary	Millionaire	495,565,211

(Assume that the domain for Wealthy Person consists of the names of all wealthy people in a pre-defined sample of wealthy people; the domain for Wealthy Person Type consists of the values 'Millionaire' and 'Billionaire'; and the domain for Net Worth in Dollars consists of all integers greater than or equal to 1,000,000.)

There is a constraint linking Wealthy Person Type to Net Worth in Dollars, even though we cannot deduce one from the other. The constraint dictates that a Millionaire will have a net worth of 1,000,000 to 999,999,999 inclusive, whilst a Billionaire will have a net worth of 1,000,000,000 or higher. This constraint is neither a domain constraint nor a key constraint; therefore we cannot rely on domain constraints and key constraints to guarantee that an inconsistent Wealthy Person Type / Net Worth in Dollars combination does not make its way into the database.

The DKNF violation could be eliminated by removing the Wealthy Person Type column. The wealthy person's status as a millionaire or billionaire is determined by their Net Worth in Dollars, as defined in the Wealthiness Status table, so no useful information is lost.

Wealthy Person
Wealthy Person	Net Worth in Dollars
Steve	124,543,621
Roderick	6,553,228,893
Katrina	8,829,462,998
Gary	495,565,211

Wealthiness Status
Status	Minimum	Maximum
Millionaire	1,000,000	999,999,999
Billionaire	1,000,000,000	999,999,999,999

== Foreign keys ==
Relationships that are impossible to express as foreign keys are obvious violations of DKNF. For example, a "Parent ID" attribute that points to one of several referenced tables, depending on a second "Parent Type" attribute, violates DKNF.

== See also ==
- Referential integrity
- Database normalization
