= Essential tuple normal form =

Normal form used in database normalization

Essential tuple normal form (ETNF) is a normal form used in database normalization. It lies strictly between fourth normal form (4NF) and fifth normal form (5NF). As per the original paper, ETNF, although strictly weaker than 5NF, is exactly as effective as 5NF in eliminating redundancy of tuples.

== History ==
Hugh Darwen, C. J. Date and Ronald Fagin introduced ETNF in their paper in March 2012.

== Definition ==
Essential Tuple Normal Form (ETNF) is a concept in the field of database normalization, which is the process of organizing the attributes of a relational database to reduce redundancy and improve data integrity. ETNF is a specific normal form that aims to ensure that the database schema is free from undesirable redundancy and dependency anomalies by focusing on the essential tuples, which are the minimal set of tuples necessary to represent the data accurately.

Key characteristics of ETNF include:

1. Reduction of Redundancy: ETNF minimizes the duplication of data by ensuring that each piece of information is stored only once.
2. Elimination of Anomalies: By organizing the data into essential tuples, ETNF helps prevent insertion, update, and deletion anomalies that can compromise data integrity.
3. Dependency Preservation: ETNF maintains functional dependencies, ensuring that the relationships between data attributes are preserved and consistent.

The goal of achieving ETNF in a database design is to create a robust, efficient, and reliable database schema that supports accurate data representation and manipulation.
