= Sixth normal form =

Form in relational database normalization

Sixth normal form (6NF) is a normal form used in relational database normalization which extends the relational algebra and generalizes relational operators (such as join) to support interval data, which can be useful in temporal databases.

The term 6NF has historically also been used to refer to another normalization degree, which today is more commonly known as domain-key normal form (DKNF) (see Other meanings).

== Definition ==
Christopher J. Date and others have defined sixth normal form as a normal form, based on an extension of the relational algebra.

Relational operators, such as join, are generalized to support a natural treatment of interval data, such as sequences of dates or moments in time, for instance in temporal databases. Sixth normal form is then based on this generalized join, as follows:

A relvar R [table] is in sixth normal form (abbreviated 6NF) if and only if it satisfies no nontrivial join dependencies at all — where, as before, a join dependency is trivial if and only if at least one of the projections (possibly U_projections) involved is taken over the set of all attributes of the relvar [table] concerned.

Date et al. have also given the following definition:

Relvar R is in sixth normal form (6NF) if and only if every JD [Join Dependency] of R is trivial — where a JD is trivial if and only if one of its components is equal to the pertinent heading in its entirety.

Any relation in 6NF is also in 5NF.

Sixth normal form is intended to decompose relation variables to irreducible components. Though this may be relatively unimportant for non-temporal relation variables, it can be important when dealing with temporal variables or other interval data. For instance, if a relation comprises a supplier's name, status, and city, we may also want to add temporal data, such as the time during which these values are, or were, valid (e.g., for historical data) but the three values may vary independently of each other and at different rates. We may, for instance, wish to trace the history of changes to Status; a review of production costs may reveal that a change was caused by a supplier changing city and hence what they charged for delivery.

For further discussion on Temporal Aggregation in SQL, see also Zimanyi. For a different approach, see TSQL2.

== Usage ==
The sixth normal form is currently as of 2009 being used in some data warehouses where the benefits outweigh the drawbacks, for example using anchor modeling. Although using 6NF leads to an explosion of tables, modern databases can prune the tables from select queries (using a process called 'table elimination' - so that a query can be solved without even reading some of the tables that the query refers to) where they are not required and thus speed up queries that only access several attributes.

== Examples ==
In order for a table to be in sixth normal form, it has to be in fifth normal form first and then it requires that each table satisfies only trivial join dependencies. Let's take a simple example with a table already in 5NF: Here, in the users table, every attribute is non null and the primary key is the username:

Users_table
Username	Department	Status

This table is in 5NF because each join dependency is implied by the unique candidate key of the table (Username). More specifically, the only possible join dependencies are: {username, status}, {username, department}.

The 6NF version would look like this:

Users
Username	Status

Users_dept
Username	Department

So, from one table in 5NF, 6NF produces two tables.

Following is another example:

TABLE 1
Medic ID	Medic Name	Occupation	Type	Practice in years
1	Smith James	Orthopedic	Specialist	23
2	Miller Michael	Orthopedic	Probationer	4
3	Thomas Linda	Neurologist	Probationer	5
4	Scott Nancy	Orthopedic	Resident	1
5	Allen Brian	Neurologist	Specialist	12
6	Turner Steven	Ophthalmologist	Probationer	3
7	Collins Kevin	Ophthalmologist	Specialist	7
8	King Donald	Neurologist	Resident	1
9	Harris Sarah	Ophthalmologist	Resident	2

The join dependencies of the table are {medic name, occupation}, {medic name, practice in years} and {medic name, type}. Hence we could see that such table is 2NF (due to the appearance of transitive dependency). The following tables try to bring it to 6NF:

TABLE 2.1
Medic ID	Medic Name
1	Smith James
2	Miller Michael
3	Thomas Linda
4	Scott Nancy
5	Allen Brian
6	Turner Steven
7	Collins Kevin
8	King Donald
9	Harris Sarah

TABLE 2.2
Medic ID	Occupation
1	Orthopedic
2	Orthopedic
3	Neurologist
4	Orthopedic
5	Neurologist
6	Ophthalmologist
7	Ophthalmologist
8	Neurologist
9	Ophthalmologist

TABLE 2.3
Medic ID	Type
1	Specialist
2	Probationer
3	Probationer
4	Resident
5	Specialist
6	Probationer
7	Specialist
8	Resident
9	Resident

TABLE 2.4
Medic ID	Practice in years
1	23
2	4
3	5
4	1
5	12
6	3
7	7
8	1
9	2

== Other meanings ==
Sixth normal form (6NF) is sometimes instead used as a synonym for domain-key normal form (DKNF). This usage predates Date et al.'s work.

== See also ==
- Anchor modeling
- Data vault modeling
- Database theory
- Temporal database
- First normal form (1NF)
- Second normal form (2NF)
- Third normal form (3NF)
- Fourth normal form (4NF)
- Fifth normal form (5NF)

== Bibliography ==
- Date, Chris J.; Darwen, Hugh; Lorentzos, Nikos A. (January 2003). Temporal Data and the Relational Model: A Detailed Investigation into the Application of Interval and Relation Theory to the Problem of Temporal Database Management. Oxford: Elsevier LTD. ISBN 1-55860-855-9.
- Date, Chris J.; Darwen, Hugh; Lorentzos, Nikos A. (12 August 2014). Time and relational theory - Temporal databases in the relational model and SQL. Elsevier-Morgan Kaufmann. ISBN 9780128006313.
- Snodgrass, Richard T. "TSQL2 Temporal Query Language".
- Zimanyi, E. (June 2006). "Temporal Aggregates and Temporal Universal Quantification in Standard SQL" (PDF). ACM SIGMOD Record, volume 35, number 2, page 16. ACM.
- Date, Chris J. "ON DK/NF NORMAL FORM". Archived from the original on 6 April 2012.
- Harrington, Jan L. (2009). Relational Database Design and Implementation: Clearly Explained. Elsevier-Morgan Kaufmann. ISBN 9780123747303.
