= Ronald Fagin =

American mathematician and computer scientist

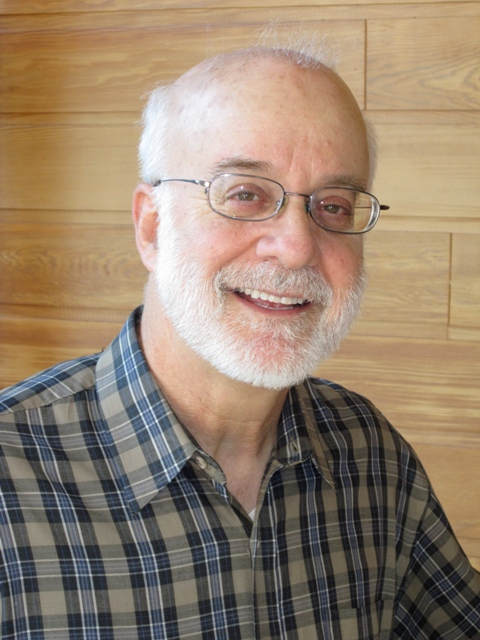
- Ronald Fagin
- Born: 1945; Oklahoma City, Oklahoma, U.S.
- Education: Dartmouth College, University of California, Berkeley
- Known for: Fagin's theorem
- Awards: Gödel Prize (2014), W. Wallace McDowell Award (2012), SIGMOD Edgar F. Codd Innovations Award. (2004)
- Scientific career
- Fields: Logic in Computer Science, Database theory, Finite model theory, Rank and score aggregation, Reasoning about knowledge
- Workplaces: IBM Research – Silicon Valley
- Doctoral advisor: Robert Lawson Vaught

Ronald Fagin (born 1945) is an American mathematician and computer scientist, and retired IBM Fellow. He is known for his work in database theory, finite model theory, and reasoning about knowledge.

== Biography ==
Ron Fagin was born and grew up in Oklahoma City, where he attended Northwest Classen High School. He was later elected to the Northwest Classen Hall of Fame. He completed his undergraduate degree at Dartmouth College. Fagin received his Ph.D. in Mathematics from the University of California, Berkeley in 1973, where he worked under the supervision of Robert Vaught.

He joined the IBM Research Division in 1973, spending two years at the Thomas J. Watson Research Center, and then transferred in 1975 to Almaden Research Center in Almaden Valley, San Jose. He retired from IBM on October 31, 2026. He now lives in Los Gatos, California.

He has served as program committee chair for ACM Symposium on Principles of Database Systems 1984, Theoretical Aspects of Reasoning about Knowledge 1994, ACM Symposium on Theory of Computing 2005, and the International Conference on Database Theory 2009.

Fagin has received numerous professional awards for his work. He is a Member of the National Academy of Sciences, National Academy of Engineering, and American Academy of Arts and Sciences. He is an IBM Fellow, ACM Fellow, IEEE Fellow, and Fellow of the American Association for the Advancement of Science. One of his papers won the Gödel Prize. He received a Docteur Honoris Causa from the University of Paris, and a Laurea Honoris Causa from the University of Calabria in Italy. The IEEE granted him the IEEE W. Wallace McDowell Award and the IEEE Technical Achievement Award, and the ACM granted him the ACM SIGMOD Edgar F. Codd Innovations Award. The European Association for Theoretical Computer Science (in conjunction with the ACM Special Interest Group for Logic and Computation, the European Association for Computer Science Logic, and the Kurt Gödel Society) granted him and the co-authors of two of his papers the Alonzo Church Award for Logic and Computation. IBM granted him eight IBM Outstanding Innovation Awards, two IBM supplemental Patent Issue Awards, given for key IBM patents, three IBM Outstanding Technical Achievement Awards, and two IBM Corporate Awards. He won Best Paper awards at the 1985 International Joint Conference on Artificial Intelligence, the 2001 ACM Symposium on Principles of Database Systems, the 2010 International Conference on Database Theory, and the 2015 International Conference on Database Theory. He won 10-year Test-of-Time Awards at the 2011 ACM Symposium on Principles of Database Systems, the 2013 International Conference on Database Theory, and the 2014 ACM Symposium on Principles of Database Systems.

== Work ==
=== Fagin's theorem ===
Fagin's theorem, which he proved in his PhD thesis, states that existential second-order logic coincides with the complexity class NP in the sense that a decision problem can be expressed in existential second-order logic if and only if it can be solved by a non-deterministic Turing machine in polynomial time. This work helped found the area of finite model theory.

=== Other contributions ===
Another result that he proved in his PhD thesis is that first-order logic has a zero-one law, which says that if S is a first-order sentence with only relational symbols (no function or constant symbols), then the fraction of n-node structures that satisfy S converges as n goes to infinity, and in fact converges to 0 or 1. This result was proved independently by Glebskiĭ and co-authors earlier (1969) in Russia, with a different proof.

He is also known for his work on higher normal forms in database theory, particularly 4NF, 5NF and DK/NF.

Besides Fagin's theorem, other concepts named after Fagin are "Fagin's algorithm" for score aggregation, the "Fagin-inverse" for data exchange, and "Fagin games" and "Ajtai–Fagin games" for proving inexpressibility results in logic.

== Publications ==
Fagin has authored or co-authored numerous articles and a book:

- Ronald Fagin, Joseph Y. Halpern, Yoram Moses, and Moshe Y. Vardi. Reasoning about knowledge. MIT press (1995). Paperback edition (2003).

Articles, a selection:

- Ronald Fagin. "Generalized first-order spectra and polynomial-time recognizable sets". Complexity of Computation, ed. R. Karp, SIAM-AMS Proceedings, Vol. 7 (1974):43-73.
- Ronald Fagin, Jurg Nievergelt, Nicholas J. Pippenger, and H. Raymond Strong. "Extendible hashing—a fast access method for dynamic files." ACM Transactions on Database Systems (TODS) 4.3 (1979): 315–344.
- Ronald Fagin, Amnon Lotem, and Moni Naor. "Optimal aggregation algorithms for middleware." Journal of Computer and System Sciences 66 (2003): 614–656. (Special issue for selected papers from the 2001 ACM Symposium on Principles of Database Systems).
- Ronald Fagin, Phokion G. Kolaitis, Renée J Miller, and Lucian Popa. "Data exchange: semantics and query answering", Theoretical Computer Science 336 (2005): 89-124. (Special issue for selected papers from the 2003 International Conference on Database Theory).
