= Atomic value =

An atomic value may refer to:

- Atomic number, the number of protons in the nucleus of an atom
- A piece of data in a database table that cannot be broken down any further (see first normal form)
