= Association for Computer Genealogy =

German genealogical society

The Association for Computer Genealogy (German: Verein für Computergenealogie, abbreviated CompGen) is a German non-profit organization, founded in 1989 in Dortmund, Germany. Initially called the Association for the Promotion of Computer-Aided Genealogical Research, the aim of the association is to "promote scientific research in genealogical related fields". The official webpage is only in German.

As of 2022, CompGen has a global membership of over 4,200 people in cooperation with other German genealogical research organizations.

CompGen operates its own web services, including a database, forums and mailing lists. They also work with other genealogical projects such as GenWiki. Members can publish their results through the association without advertising.

CompGen uses a "Historical Place Directory", a project that creates a location database, useful for family researchers, historians and sociologists.

With the data-entry-system (DES) for historical personal data, the association has created a technical basis for historical crowdsourcing projects. Users can record digitalized printed or handwritten sources into the database.

After an initial recording project during the 100th anniversary of the First World War from 2014 to 2018, CompGen was able to record around 8 million personal data records from official casualty and death listings of German soldiers during the First World War (1914–1918).

The association is now expanding in recording historical address directories, police reports and church registers.

All data and information provided can be used online free of charge, even by non-members.

The association publishes a quarterly magazine, Computergenealogie (CG), subscription to which is included in the membership fee.

In addition, a 200-page booklet "Familienforschung (Ancestry research made easy - computer genealogy for everyone)" is published at irregular intervals.
