= Elementary key normal form =

Level of database normalisation

Elementary key normal form (EKNF) is a subtle enhancement on third normal form, thus EKNF tables are in 3NF by definition. This happens when there is more than one unique compound key and they overlap. Such cases can cause redundant information in the overlapping column(s).

== History ==
EKNF was defined by Carlo Zaniolo in 1982.

== Definition ==
A table is in EKNF if and only if all its elementary functional dependencies begin at whole keys or end at elementary key attributes. For every full non-trivial functional dependency of the form X→Y, either X is a key or Y is (a part of) an elementary key.

In this definition, an elementary functional dependency is a full functional dependency (a non-trivial functional dependency X → A such that there is no functional dependency X' → A that also holds with X' being a strict subset of X), and an elementary key is a key X for which there exists an attribute A such that X → A is an elementary functional dependency.

== Example ==
Consider the following scenario. There is an order process for glasses in which a frame and lens must be specified. The lens product must be a lens and the frame product must be a frame. For this constraint to be maintained, the product type is added to the row for each product.

Orders
| Person | FrameId | FrameProductType | LensId | LensProductType |
|---|---|---|---|---|
| Larry | 1 | Frame | 3 | Lens |
| Moe | 2 | Frame | 4 | Lens |
| Moe | 1 | Frame | 4 | Lens |

Product
| Id | Name | Type |
|---|---|---|
| 1 | Standard | Frame |
| 2 | Custom | Frame |
| 3 | Standard | Lens |
| 4 | Custom | Lens |

In the above scenario, there would be a constraint on FrameProductType and LensProductType where they must be Frame and Lens respectively, and there would be a foreign key relationship to product on both Id and productType for FrameId, FrameProductType and LensId, LensProductType respectively. For this foreign key relationship to work, an "elementary key" must be made on the Product table on Id and Type. This is generally accomplished via a unique key constraint. Without this relationship and constraint, a lens could be selected for the frame and a frame for the lens.
