= Nested SQL =

In relational databases, a nested table is a table that is embedded within another table.

Individual elements can be inserted, updated, and deleted in a nested table. Since individual elements can be modified in a nested table, they are more flexible than an array because elements in an array can only be modified as a whole, not individually.

A nested table doesn't have a maximum size, and an arbitrary number of elements can be stored in it.
