= Composite key =

Candidate key with two or more attributes in a database

In database design, a composite key is a candidate key that consists of two or more attributes, (table columns) that together uniquely identify an entity occurrence (table row).

A compound key is a composite key for which each attribute that makes up the key is a foreign key in its own right.

== Advantages ==
Composite keys have advantages similar to that of a natural key as it is often composed of multiple natural key attributes.

=== Storage ===
Composite keys use less disk space as compared to defining a surrogate key column, this is because the composite key already exists as attributes in the table and does not need to be defined in the table just for the purpose of unique identification. This simplifies the table and also saves space.

=== Easier to implement and use ===
Composite keys are easy to implement in a database schema as their component parts are already named items in the database. When they are also natural keys, they are often intuitive for real world scenarios. They are often used when a non-composite key does not always uniquely identify a record. For example, a personal name may often, but not always, be unique in a given database, and some other field such as date of birth may be added to make uniqueness much more probable.

== Disadvantages ==
=== Requirement changes ===
The business requirements and rules can change which can change the format of certain real world entities. Composite keys are formed of multiple natural keys which are related to the real world and with the change of their format in the real world, their format in the database will also be changed. This is inconvenient as the number of attributes of composite key will change and all the foreign keys would need to be updated.

=== Complexity and storage ===
A composite key consists of multiple attributes and the composite key will be referenced in multiple tables as the foreign key, this uses a lot of disk space as multiple columns are being stored as the foreign key instead of just possibly one. This makes the schema complex and the queries become more CPU expensive as for every join the DBMS will need to compare three attributes instead of just possibly one in case of a single natural key.

== Example ==
An example is an entity that represents the modules each student is attending at University. The entity has a studentID and a moduleCode as its primary key. Each of the attributes that makes up the primary key is a simple key because each represents a unique reference when identifying a student in one instance and a module in the other, so this key is a compound key.

In contrast, using the same example, imagine we identified a student by their firstName + lastName (assuming that people must have different names). In a table representing students our primary key would now be firstName + lastName. Because students can have the same firstName or the same lastName these attributes are not simple keys. The primary key firstName + lastName for students is a composite key.

== See also ==
- Relational database
- Alternate key
- Candidate key
- Foreign key
- Primary key
- Unique key
- Superkey
