= Superkey =

Set of attributes that uniquely identifies each tuple of a relation

In the relational data model, a superkey is any set of attributes that uniquely identifies each tuple of a relation. Because superkey values are unique, tuples with the same superkey value must also have the same non-key attribute values. That is, non-key attributes are functionally dependent on the superkey.

The set of all attributes is always a superkey (the trivial superkey). Tuples in a relation are by definition unique, with duplicates removed after each operation, so the set of all attributes is always uniquely valued for every tuple. A candidate key (or minimal superkey) is a superkey that can't be reduced to a simpler superkey by removing an attribute.

For example, in an employee schema with attributes employeeID, name, job, and departmentID, if employeeID values are unique then employeeID combined with any or all of the other attributes can uniquely identify tuples in the table. Each combination, {employeeID}, {employeeID, name}, {employeeID, name, job}, and so on is a superkey. {employeeID} is a candidate key, since no subset of its attributes is also a superkey. {employeeID, name, job, departmentID} is the trivial superkey.

If attribute set K is a superkey of relation R, then at all times it is the case that the projection of R over K has the same cardinality as R itself.

== Example ==
English Monarchs
Monarch Name	Monarch Number	Royal House
Edward	II	Plantagenet
Edward	III	Plantagenet
Richard	III	Plantagenet
Henry	IV	Lancaster

First, list out all the sets of attributes:

• {}
• {Monarch Name}
• {Monarch Number}
• {Royal House}
• {Monarch Name, Monarch Number}
• {Monarch Name, Royal House}
• {Monarch Number, Royal House}
• {Monarch Name, Monarch Number, Royal House}

Second, eliminate all the sets which do not meet superkey's requirement. For example, {Monarch Name, Royal House} cannot be a superkey because for the same attribute values (Edward, Plantagenet), there are two distinct tuples:

- (Edward, II, Plantagenet)
- (Edward, III, Plantagenet)

Finally, after elimination, the remaining sets of attributes are the only possible superkeys in this example:

- {Monarch Name, Monarch Number} — this is also the candidate key
- {Monarch Name, Monarch Number, Royal House} — this is also the trivial superkey.

In reality, superkeys cannot be determined simply by examining one set of tuples in a relation. A superkey defines a functional dependency constraint of a relation schema which must hold for all possible instance relations of that relation schema.

== See also ==
- Alternate key
- Candidate key
- Compound key
- Foreign key
- Primary key
