= Relational =

Relational may refer to:

== Business ==
- Relational capital, the value inherent in a company's relationships with its customers, vendors, and other important constituencies
- Relational contract, a contract whose effect is based upon a relationship of trust between the parties
- Relational goods, goods that cannot be enjoyed alone
- Relational Investors, an activist investment fund based in San Diego, California

== Computing ==
- Relational calculus, part of the relational model for databases that provides a declarative way to specify database queries
- Relational database, a database that has a collection of tables of data items, all of which is formally described and organized according to the relational model
  - Relational classification, the procedure of performing classification in relational databases
  - Relational data mining, the data mining technique for relational databases
- Relational concept, a set of mathematically defined tuples in tuple relational calculus
- Relational model, a database model based on first-order predicate logic
- Relational operator, a programming language construct or operator that tests or defines some kind of relation between two entities

== Linguistics ==
- Relational grammar, a syntactic theory which argues that primitive grammatical relations provide the ideal means to state syntactic rules in universal terms
- Relational noun, a class of words used in many languages
- Relational oppositeness, the relationship between two words which seem to be opposites but actually imply each other

== Mathematics ==
- Relational algebra, an offshoot of first-order logic and of algebra of sets concerned with operations over finitary relations
- Relation (mathematics) such as binary relation, a collection of ordered pairs of elements of a set

== Psychology ==
- Relational aggression or covert bullying, a type of aggression in which harm is caused through damage to one's relationships or social status
- Relational disorder, a disorder affecting a relationship rather than an individual in the relationship
- Relational psychoanalysis, a school of psychoanalysis in the United States that emphasizes the role of real and imagined relationships with others in mental disorder and psychotherapy

== Other uses ==
- Relational art, a mode or tendency in fine art practice originally observed and highlighted by French art critic Nicolas Bourriaud
- Relational dialectics, a concept within communication theory
- Relational theory, a framework to understand reality or a physical system in such a way that the positions and other properties of objects are only meaningful relative to other objects

== See also ==
- Relational schema (disambiguation)
