= David McGoveran =

American computer scientist

David McGoveran (born 1952) is an American computer scientist and physicist, software industry analyst, and inventor. In computer science, he is recognized as one of the pioneers of relational database theory.

== Education ==
David McGoveran majored in physics and mathematics, and minored in cognition and communication at the University of Chicago from 1973 to 1976, with graduate studies in physics and psycholinguistics. He pursued additional graduate studies from 1976 to 1979 at Stanford University.

== Career ==
While a student he was employed by the Enrico Fermi Institute's Laboratory for Astrophysics and Space Research (Chicago 1973–4), Dow Chemical Company's Western Applied Science and Technology Laboratories (Walnut Creek, CA 1974), and University of Chicago Hospitals and Clinics (1975–6). After graduation from University of Chicago, he founded the consulting firm of Alternative Technologies (Menlo Park, CA 1976) under the mentoring of H. Dean Brown and Cuthbert Hurd. While starting his consulting practice, he worked at SRI International (1976–9), his first consulting client.

Between 1979 and 1981, he taught electronics engineering in the Professional Engineering Institute at Menlo College (Redwood City, CA) and was Chairman of the Computer Science and Business Departments at Condie College (San Jose, CA), developing the schools bachelor program in computer science.

Alternative Technologies has provided consulting on the design and development of numerous software systems, specializing in mission critical and distributed applications. Clients have included AT&T, Blue Cross, Digital Equipment, Goldman Sachs, HP, IBM, Microsoft, MCI-Worldcom, Oracle, and many others.

McGoveran's software engineering contributions include a collaborative conferencing system (1978); multi-tier relational CIM (computer integrated manufacturing) system (Fasttrack, 1982); relational access manager (1984–89); international electronic funds transfer (1984); trading systems databases (1986–91); OLCP requirements (1986); an object-relational portfolio management (1986–89); first Sybase SQL Server PC client (1987); client-server API requirements (1988); object-relational API requirements (1990); query optimizer requirements (1990); first middleware market analysis and forecast (1991); Database Connectivity Benchmark (1993); numerous high availability and scalable systems (1994–96); and designed BPMS products and established the BPM category (1998–2000) with HP and IBM.

He has chaired various professional conferences (1975–2001). He assesses software opportunities and risks for vendors, venture capitalists and other investors; and occasionally serves as an expert in software intellectual property litigation.

== Research ==
=== Mathematical Logic ===
Work on applications of mathematical logic has pervaded Mr. McGoveran's career (1971–present). He has done original research and published on the structure of paradoxes, applications of quantum logic to schizophrenia, linguistic logic and computational semantics (under James D. McCawley), fuzzy logic, and applications of logic, including multi-valued logics, to databases.

=== Transaction Management ===
Beginning in 1981, Mr. McGoveran began consulting on the design of transaction processing systems, including distributed transactions. Investigations into the complexity and cost of distributed transactions, as well as the difficulty of maintaining transactional consistency in online applications led to research into alternatives to the traditional transaction models that used pessimistic concurrency control and enforced ACID properties. McGoveran defined physical transactions as the unit of recovery, logical transactions as the unit of consistency, and business transactions as the unit of audit The resulting adaptive transaction model introduces a transaction intrinsic definition of consistency, deferring the decision to combine the results of two or more transactions. His work on transaction management resulted in the award of US Patent No 7,103,597.

=== Relational Data Model and Related Research ===
McGoveran's research on E.F. Codd's relational model has focused on the issues of data modeling (database design), missing information, and view updating. The last two are considered by some database researchers to be the most difficult and controversial problems in relational database research.

Having worked on the design and development of several early large scale, distributed, commercial relational database applications, McGoveran sought to improve upon the science of database design. This work lead to the development of

1. new analyses of and solutions to the problem of "missing information" and avoiding the use of nulls and therefore many-valued logic
2. the specification and uses of relation predicates (relation or set membership functions) as an application of Leibniz' Law
3. a new design principle (with C. J. Date) now known as the Principle of Orthogonal Design (POOD)

His work on logic applied to relational databases and on design without nulls (1993) has been republished several times.

McGoveran tackled the problem of view updating with Christopher J. Date starting in 1993 after having developed methods for reversible schema migration for clients on Wall Street. His solution, based on relation predicates, formed the basis for the algorithms found in The Third Manifesto (Christopher J. Date, Hugh Darwen) for updating virtual relations (e.g., views). Date has credited McGoveran with originally suggesting the basic idea for the view updating approach, and which Hugh Darwen says represented a major shift in thinking on the issue. This work has resulted in two patents (U.S. Patent 7,620,664 and U.S. Patent 7,263,512).

Some of McGoveran's work on databases is discussed at Fabian Pascal's Database Debunkings web site.

=== EAI and Business Process Management ===
After consulting on numerous data integration and enterprise application integration projects, and related middleware products, McGoveran recognized that process aspects of integration were largely overlooked. Most business process technology focused on analyzing and documenting existing business processes, then manually "reengineering" the processes to eliminate waste, remove bottlenecks, and improve cycle times. These efforts were largely disjoint from process automation systems and distributed control systems (which focused on highly repetitive, often continuous processes), and workflow technologies (which focused on highly repetitive sequential processes like document processing).

McGoveran postulated an analogy between data management and process management. Just as the relational data model proposed separating the logical model of the data from the physical storage model, it seemed that a logical process model (i.e., the business process model) should be separated from its physical implementation (e.g., as messaging, remote invocation, services, etc.). As with the relational model, this would permit business process design via models that were logically separated from specifics of process implementation, process scheduling, and process optimization. By introducing process measurement and analytics into the proposed process management system, closed loop process control became theoretically possible. The result was a set of requirements and a canonical architecture for the then largely unknown business process management system (BPMS).

The first commercial package compliant with this BPMS architecture ChangEngine - was then built and introduced by Hewlett-Packard in 1997–98 under McGoveran's direction. Subsequently, McGoveran introduced these concepts at DCI's EAI conference in 1999, through work as Sr. Technical Editor of the eAI Journal (Thomas Communications) and worked with companies like IBM, Vitria, Candle, Fuego, Savvion, and numerous others to help shape the market and the BPM category. Many workflow and business process reengineering (BPR) companies joined in the effort, transforming themselves into BPM companies during the period 1999–2010.

== Affiliations ==
- Secretary-treasurer of the Alternative Natural Philosophy Association (Cambridge University) from 1982 to 1986, and served as co-editor of the organization’s newsletter with John Amson.
- Co-founder, Alternative Natural Philosophy Association West (ANPA West) and its non-profit corporation (1984), along with H. Pierre Noyes and Chris Gefwert, organized its first three conferences, and was recipient Second Annual Alternative Natural Philosopher Award in 1990.
- Co-founder, Database Associates with Colin White, Richard Finkelstein & Paul Winsberg (1990).
- Wrote and published (initially with Colin White) the Database Product Evaluation Reports (1989–1996).
- Founded the 60 member Enterprise Integration Council (1999–2002).
- ACM Life Member (1983)
- Amer. Math. Society Life Member (1996)
- IEEE Member (1978).
- Consulting editor for an international research journal (1975–6)
- Associate editor for InfoDB (1990–4)
- Sr. technical editor of the eAI Journal/Business Integration Journal (1999–2006).
- He served as a judge in technology awards including the CrossRoads A-List, the eAI Journal and Business Integration Journal Awards, and the IBM Beacon Awards.

== Selected publications ==
McGoveran has written articles in the fields of relational databases, transaction processing, business intelligence, enterprise application integration, business process management, mathematics, and physics, including over 100 monthly columns for eAI Journal (a.k.a. Business Integration Journal) throughout the life of the journal.

=== Books ===
- Date, C.J., Darwen, H., McGoveran, D. (1998). Relational Database Writings, 1994–1997. Reading, MA: Addison-Wesley. ISBN 0-201-39814-1.
- McGoveran, D., Date, C. J. (1992). A Guide to Sybase and SQL Server. Reading, MA: Addison-Wesley. ISBN 0-201-55710-X.
- ——— (December 1993 – March 1994), "Nothing from Nothing", Database Programming & Design, San Francisco, California: Miller-Freeman (in four parts).

=== Encyclopedia articles ===
- McGoveran, D., (1991). The Evaluation of Optimizers. Encyclopedia Computer Science and Technology: Volume 26, Supplement 11. New York, NY:Marcel Dekker.
- ——— (1993), "The Evaluation of Optimizers", Encyclopedia of Microcomputers, vol. 13, New York, NY: CRC Press, ISBN 978-0-82472711-6 & ISBN 0-82472711-8.
