= Calculus (disambiguation) =

Calculus (from Latin calculus meaning ‘pebble’, plural calculī) in its most general sense is any method or system of calculation. Less commonly, it may refer to certain things resembling pebbles. Contemporarily, an unqualified reference to "calculus" typically refers to differential and integral calculus.

Calculus may refer to:

== Biology ==
- Calculus (spider), a genus of the family Oonopidae
- Caseolus calculus, a genus and species of small land snails

== Medicine ==
- Dental calculus, deposits of calcium phosphate salts on teeth, also known as tartar
- Calculus (concretion), a stone formed in the body such as a gall stone or kidney stone

== Mathematics ==
- Infinitesimal calculus (or simply "calculus"), which investigates motion and rates of change
  - Differential calculus
  - Integral calculus
  - Non-standard calculus, an approach to infinitesimal calculus using Robinson's infinitesimals
- Exterior calculus, which provides algebraic tools to calculate integrands
- Calculus of sums and differences (difference operator), also called the finite-difference calculus, a discrete analogue of "calculus"
- Functional calculus, a way to apply various types of functions to operators
- Schubert calculus, a branch of algebraic geometry
- Tensor calculus (also called tensor analysis), a generalization of vector calculus that encompasses tensor fields
  - Vector calculus (also called vector analysis), comprising specialized notations for multivariable analysis of vectors in an inner-product space
  - Matrix calculus, a specialized notation for multivariable calculus over spaces of matrices
- Numerical calculus (also called numerical analysis), the study of numerical approximations
- Umbral calculus, the combinatorics of certain operations on polynomials
- The calculus of variations, a field of study that deals with extremizing functionals
- Itô calculus An extension of calculus to stochastic processes.

== Logic ==
- Logical calculus, a formal system that defines a language and rules to derive an expression from premises
  - Propositional calculus, specifies the rules of inference governing the logic of propositions
  - Predicate calculus, specifies the rules of inference governing the logic of predicates
  - Proof calculus, a framework for expressing systems of logical inference
    - Sequent calculus, a proof calculus for first-order logic
    - Cirquent calculus, a proof calculus based on graph-style structures called cirquents
  - Situation calculus, a framework for describing relations within a dynamic system
    - Event calculus, a model for reasoning about events and their effects
    - Fluent calculus, a model for describing relations within a dynamic system
- Calculus of relations, the manipulation of binary relations with the algebra of sets, composition of relations, and transpose relations
- Epsilon calculus, a logical language which replaces quantifiers with the epsilon operator
- Modal μ-calculus, a common temporal logic used by formal verification methods such as model checking

== Physics ==
- Bondi k-calculus, a method used in relativity theory
- Jones calculus, used in optics to describe polarized light
- Mueller calculus, used in optics to handle Stokes vectors, which describe the polarization of incoherent light
- Operational calculus, used to solve differential equations arising in electronics

== Formal language ==
- Lambda calculus, a formulation of the theory of reflexive functions that has deep connections to computational theory
  - Kappa calculus, a reformulation of the first-order fragment of typed lambda calculus
  - Rho calculus, introduced as a general means to uniformly integrate rewriting into lambda calculus
- Process calculus, a set of approaches to formulating formal models of concurrent systems
  - Ambient calculus, a family of models for concurrent systems based on the concept of agent mobility
  - Join calculus, a theoretical model for the design of distributed programming languages
  - π-calculus, a formulation of the theory of concurrent, communicating processes
- Relational calculus, a calculus for the relational data model
  - Domain relational calculus
  - Tuple calculus
- Refinement calculus, a way of refining models of programs into efficient programs

== Other meanings ==
- a calculus (pl. calculi), a Roman counting token
- Battlefield calculus, military calculation of all known factors into the decision-making and action-planning process
- Calculus of negligence, a legal standard in U.S. tort law to determine if a duty of care has been breached
- Felicific calculus, a procedure to evaluate the benefit of an action, according to Bentham
- Professor Calculus, a fictional character in the comic-strip series The Adventures of Tintin

== See also ==
- List of calculus topics
- List of formal systems
