= List of formal systems =

This is a list of formal systems, also known as logical calculi.

== Mathematical ==
- Functional calculus, a way to apply various types of functions to operators
- Matrix calculus, a specialized notation for multivariable calculus over spaces of matrices
- Umbral calculus, the combinatorics of certain operations on polynomials
- Vector calculus (also called vector analysis), comprising specialized notations for multivariable analysis of vectors in an inner-product space

=== Logical ===
- Predicate calculus, specifies the rules of inference governing the logic of predicates
- Propositional calculus, specifies the rules of inference governing the logic of propositions

=== In theoretical computer science (Formal language) ===
- Modal μ-calculus, a common temporal logic used by formal verification methods such as model checking
- Lambda calculus, a formulation of the theory of reflexive functions that has deep connections to computational theory
  - Kappa calculus, a reformulation of the first-order fragment of typed lambda calculus
  - Rho calculus, introduced as a general means to uniformly integrate rewriting into lambda calculus
- Process calculus, a set of approaches to formulating formal models of concurrent systems
  - Ambient calculus, a family of models for concurrent systems based on the concept of agent mobility
  - Join calculus, a theoretical model for the design of distributed programming languages
  - π-calculus, a formulation of the theory of concurrent, communicating processes, that was invented by Robin Milner
- Relational calculus, a calculus for the relational data model
  - Domain relational calculus
  - Tuple calculus, inspired the SQL language
- Refinement calculus, a way of refining models of programs into efficient programs

== Other formal systems ==
- Formal ethics – Formal logical system

== See also ==
- Formal system – Mathematical model for deduction or proof systems
- Computability:Formal models
  - Model of computation – Mathematical model describing how an output of a function is computed given an input
- Calculus (disambiguation)
