= Relvar =

In relational databases, relvar is a term introduced by C. J. Date and Hugh Darwen as an abbreviation for relation variable in their 1995 paper The Third Manifesto, to avoid the confusion sometimes arising from the use of the term "relation", by the inventor of the relational model, E. F. Codd, for a variable to which a relation is assigned as well as for the relation itself. The term is used in Date's well-known database textbook An Introduction to Database Systems and in various other books authored or coauthored by him.

Some database textbooks use the term relation for both the variable and the data it contains. Similarly, texts on SQL tend to use the term table for both purposes, though the qualified term base table is used in the standard for the variable.

A closely related term often used in academic texts is relation schema, this being a set of attributes paired with a set of constraints, together defining a set of relations for the purpose of some discussion (typically, database normalization). Constraints that mention just one relvar are termed relvar constraints, so relation schema can be regarded as a single term encompassing a relvar and its relvar constraints.
