= Nullary relation =

Relation with zero attributes

In mathematics, a nullary relation, 0-ary relation, or relation of degree zero is a relation with zero attributes. There are exactly two relations of degree zero. One has cardinality zero; that is, contains no tuples at all. The other has cardinality 1 and contains only the unique 0-tuple.^{:56}

The zero-degree relations represent true and false in relational algebra.^{:57} Under the closed-world assumption, an n-ary relation is interpreted as the extension of some n-adic predicate: all and only those n-tuples whose values, substituted for corresponding free variables in the predicate, yield propositions that hold true, appear in the relation. A zero-degree relation is therefore interpreted as the extension of the 0-adic predicate P() → true. The zero-degree relation with cardinality zero therefore represents false because it contains no tuples that yield a true proposition, and the zero-degree relation with cardinality 1 represents true because it contains the unique 0-tuple that yields a true proposition.

The zero-degree relations are also significant as identities for certain operators in the relational algebra. The zero-degree relation of cardinality 1 is the identity with respect to join (⋈); that is, when it is joined with any other relation R, the result is R. Defining an identity with respect to join makes it possible to extend the binary join operator into a n-ary join operator.^{:89}

Since the relational Cartesian product is a special case of join, the zero-degree relation of cardinality 1 is also the identity with respect to the Cartesian product.^{:89}

A projection of a relation over no attributes yields one of the relations of degree zero. If the projected relation has cardinality 0, the projection will have cardinality 0; if the projected relation has positive cardinality, the result will have cardinality 1.

Hugh Darwen refers to the zero-degree relation with cardinality 0 as TABLE_DUM and the relation with cardinality 1 as TABLE_DEE, alluding to the characters Tweedledum and Tweedledee.

== See also ==
- Empty set
- Identity element
- Relational algebra
