= Nikos Lorentzos =

Greek professor of Informatics

Nikos Lorentzos is a Greek professor of Informatics. He is a specialist on the Relational Model of Database Management, having made contributions in the field of temporal databases, where he has co-authored a book with Hugh Darwen and Christopher J Date.

== Bibliography ==
- Date, Christopher J; Darwen, Hugh; Lorentzos, Nikos A (November 2002). Temporal Data and the Relational Model: a detailed investigation into the application of interval and relation theory to the problem of temporal database management (paperback). Data Management Systems (1st ed.). San Diego, CA: Morgan Kaufmann. ISBN 1-55860-855-9. LCCN 2002110398. OCLC 51453450. LCC QA76.9.D3 D3729 2003. 422 pages.
