= Fabian Pascal =

Romanian-American consultant

Fabian Pascal is a Romanian-American consultant to large software vendors such as IBM, Oracle Corporation, and Borland, but he is better known as an author and seminar speaker. Born in Romania, Pascal lives in the San Francisco, CA area of the US, and works in association with Christopher J. Date.

Pascal is known for his sharp criticisms of the data management industry, trade press, the current state of higher education, Western culture and alleged media bias. Pascal advocates strict adherence to the principles of the relational model, and argues that departing from the model in the name of pragmatism is responsible for serious data management troubles. Criticism of Pascal's advocacy often centers around his polemical style, which some perceive as overly confrontational and unprofessional.

He publishes political commentary on The PostWest blog about the decline of Western education and civilization and Middle East issues.

== Quotes ==
- "A lot of what is being said, written, or done in the database management field — or whatever is left of it — by vendors, the trade press and "experts" is irrelevant, misleading, or outright wrong. While this is to a degree true of computing in general, in the database field the problems are so acute that, claims to the contrary notwithstanding, technology is actually regressing!"
- "The relational model is application of science — logic and math — to database management. The notion that one is "fanatic" about that is tantamount to claiming that civil engineering is fanatical about the laws of physics. Such a claim reveals problems more serious than ignorance of data fundamentals, and THAT is what deserves disdain." Fabian Pascal, August 29, 2005

== Publications ==
- Pascal, Fabian (1990). SQL and relational basics. Redwood City, CA: M&T Books. ISBN 1-55851-063-X. LCCN 90005525. OCLC 21037159. LCC QA76.73.S67 P37 1990. 336 pp.
- Pascal, Fabian (1993). Understanding relational databases with examples in SQL-92. New York, NY: Wiley. ISBN 0-471-58538-6. LCCN 93007595. OCLC 27812796. LCC QA76.9.D3 P3486 1993. 278 pp.
- Pascal, Fabian (2000). Practical issues in database management : a reference for the thinking practitioner. Boston, MA: Addison-Wesley. ISBN 0-201-48555-9. LCCN 00022984. OCLC 43434672. LCC QA76.9.D3 P34855 2000. 256 pp.

== See also ==
- Christopher J. Date
- Hugh Darwen
- David McGoveran
- Principle of orthogonal design (POOD)
