= Row data gateway =

Software design pattern for database access

Illustration of the concept

Row Data Gateway is a design pattern in which an object acts as a gateway to a single database row.
