= A Relational Model of Data for Large Shared Data Banks =

"A Relational Model of Data for Large Shared Data Banks" is a seminal 1970 paper by computer scientist Edgar F. Codd published in the Communications of the ACM. The article introduced the widely used relational model in the field of database management and is therefore one of the most widely cited papers in computer science.

Despite being celebrated as a pioneering work the field, the widely cited 1970 paper developed the ideas from the internal research report Codd wrote in 1969 for the IBM. For one, contrary to the 1970 version, the 1969 version allowed for the attributes to be relation valued. The article has since reappeared in the print once again, for the first time as part of the CACM 25th Anniversary Issue. The 1969 report was reprinted on its 40th anniversary in 2009 in ACM SIGMOD Record.

== Influence ==
According to media scholar Kevin Driscoll, part of the appeal of the model was that it “abstracted the technical details of physical storage from the logical relationships among the data being stored”. Among other things, this allowed database systems based on Codd's model to be accessed by a wider audience.

According to another media scholar Bernhard Rider, the paper revolutionized the division of labor in corporate settings because at the time “this is obviously not (yet) the manager sitting in front of a screen and keyboard but rather the application programmer that will implement the “query, update, and report” functions every larger organizations rely on for management“.
