= Giambattista Magistrini =

Italian mathematician (1777–1849)

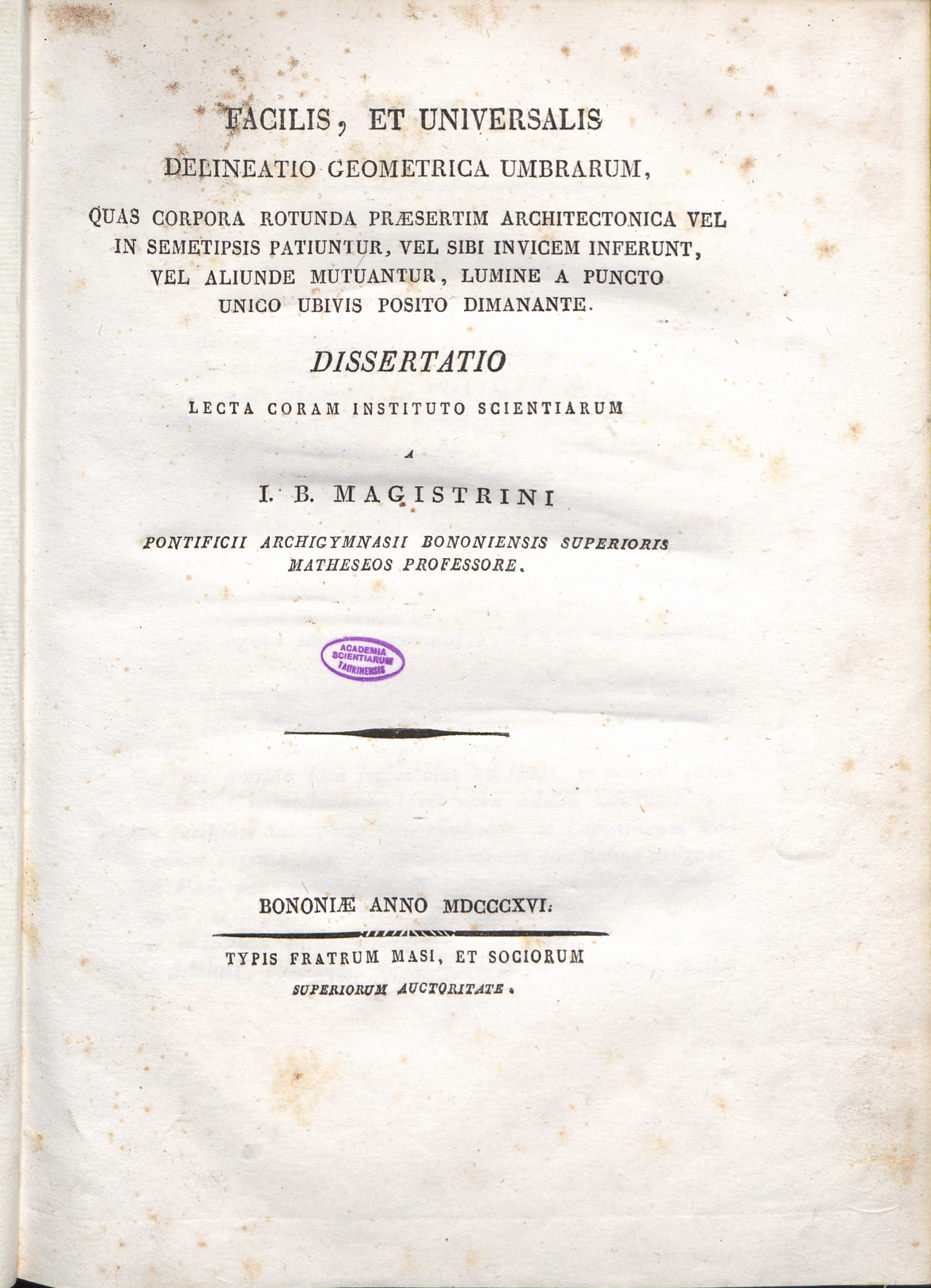
Facilis, et universalis delineatio geometrica umbrarum, 1816

Giambattista Magistrini (1777 – 1849) was an Italian mathematician.

From 1804 he was professor of calculation at the University of Bologna.

From 1811 he was a fellow of the Accademia nazionale delle scienze.

== Works ==
- Descrizione di un teodolite scenografico (in Italian). Verona: Luigi Mainardi. 1812.
- Facilis, et universalis delineatio geometrica umbrarum (in Latin). Bologna: Fratelli Masi & C. 1816.
- Osservazioni varie sopra alcuni punti principali di matematica superiore (in Italian). Verona: Luigi Mainardi. 1816.
- Discorso in lode di Luigi La-Grange (in Italian). Bologna: Annesio Nobili. 1819. (Speech in praise of Joseph-Louis Lagrange)
