= Principle of orthogonal design =

Principle of relational database design

The principle of orthogonal design (abbreviated POOD) was developed by database researchers David McGoveran and Christopher J. Date in the early 1990s, and first published "A New Database Design Principle" in the July 1994 issue of Database Programming and Design and reprinted several times. It is the second of the two principles of database design, which seek to prevent databases from being too complicated or redundant, the first principle being the principle of full normalization (POFN).

Simply put, it says that no two relations in a relational database should be defined in such a way that they can represent the same facts. As with database normalization, POOD serves to eliminate uncontrolled storage redundancy and expressive ambiguity, especially useful for applying updates to virtual relations (e.g., view (database)). Although simple in concept, POOD is frequently misunderstood and the formal expression of POOD continues to be refined.

The principle is a restatement of the requirement that a database is a minimum cover set of the relational algebra. The relational algebra allows data duplication in the relations that are the elements of the algebra. One of the efficiency requirements of a database is that there be no data duplication. This requirement is met by the minimum cover set of the relational algebra.

== Sources ==
- Database Debunkings: The Principle of Orthogonal Design, Part I, by D. McGoveran and C. J. Date
- Database Debunkings: The Principle of Orthogonal Design, Part II, by D. McGoveran and C. J. Date
