= Relational schema =

In databases, relational schema may refer to

- a database schema, in the relational paradigm
- a (single) relation schema
- Database schema. ... The term "schema" refers to the organization of data as a blueprint of how the database is constructed (divided into database tables in the case of relational databases). The formal definition of a database schema is a set of formulas (sentences) called integrity constraints imposed on a database.
