= Lex de Haan =

Lex de Haan (11 August 1954 – 1 February 2006) was an independent author, lecturer, researcher, and consultant, specializing in relational database technology.

== Biography ==
Lex was a teacher of Mathematics/Informatics in secondary school level during the years between 1976 and 1985.

Between 1985 and 1989 Lex was employed for one year in the research department of a Dutch independent system vendor - Minihouse/Multihouse - and then moved to the education department, where he developed and delivered courses in the following areas: relational databases and SQL, Oracle system development, and database administration (Oracle versions 4/5/6), Unix for system users and Unix system administration, VAX/VMS for system users and VAX/VMS system administration, and teaching skills workshops. Lex de Haan was also responsible for hiring and mentoring new instructors.

Between 1988 and 1990 Lex developed his own courseware as an independent contractor in "De Haan Consultancy", advised organizations about education needs, and delivered classes. Some important customers: the Dutch Ministry of Health and Culture, and the Dutch Government Education Institute (ROI). He also worked on a regular basis with Frans Remmen (a Dutch RDBMS and SQL guru at that time) as a senior consultant, courseware developer, and instructor for PAO courses (a well-known Dutch post-academic education organization).

In 1999 Lex de Haan joined the Dutch national body of the ISO standardization committee for the SQL Language to work on the SQL:1999 and SQL:2003 standards.

In 2002 Lex was involved in The OakTable Network of Oracle experts from the very beginning. See http://www.oaktable.net.

In March 2004 Lex was independent again, after 14 years of employment by Oracle. Lex taught seminars and courses as Natural Join B.V. (data server internals, Oracle Database 10g new features, and SQL) in Belgium, France, Denmark, Slovakia, Sweden, Turkey, United Kingdom, Ireland, Saudi Arabia, and Bahrain.

Another year with a lot of teaching and traveling, just like 2004. Lex de Haan also delivered some well-received presentations during the Hotsos Symposium in Dallas (Texas) and the UKOUG Conference in Birmingham. Lex de Haan also started writing a new book, together with Toon Koppelaars, with the exciting tentative title "Applied Mathematics for Database Professionals" to appear mid-2006. Last, but not least, he started organizing his own seminar events.

In February 2005 Lex de Haan invited Tom Kyte (from the US) to come over to The Netherlands to teach a three-day seminar in Utrecht. This first event became a great success.

In October 2005 he invited Steve Adams (Sydney, Australia) for a second seminar, which again was very successful.

A seminar series was born, and several events with Oracle gurus from all over the world were scheduled for 2006.

== Books ==
Lex de Haan is the author of the following books:

- Mastering Oracle SQL and SQL*Plus, ISBN 1-59059-448-7
- Leerboek Oracle SQL, ISBN 90-395-2286-3
- Applied Mathematics for Database Professionals, ISBN 1-59059-745-1

== Articles ==
OracleEkspert Magazine published an article in April 2004 by Lex de Haan entitled 'Lex in SQL Server land'.

Oracle Magazine published an article in the July/August 2005 issue by Lex de Haan and Jonathan Gennick entitled 'Nulls: Nothing to worry about'.

== Presentations ==
In November 2003 Lex de Haan held the presentation 'The Oracle Database: Past, Present, and Future' during a conference at the University of Aalborg, Denmark

== References and external links ==
- Lex de Haan on orafaq.com
- Lex in Memoriam on oaktable.net
