= Codd's 12 rules =

Relational database design

Codd's twelve rules is a set of thirteen rules (numbered zero to twelve) proposed by Edgar F. Codd, a pioneer of the relational model for databases, designed to define what is required from a database management system in order for it to be considered relational, i.e., a relational database management system (RDBMS). They are sometimes referred to as "Codd's Twelve Commandments".

== History ==
Codd originally set out the rules in 1970, and developed them further in a 1974 conference paper. His aim was to prevent the vision of the original relational database from being diluted, as database vendors scrambled in the early 1980s to repackage existing products with a relational veneer. Rule 12 was particularly designed to counter such a positioning.

While in 1999, a textbook stated "Nowadays, most RDBMSs ... pass the test", another in 2007 suggested "no database system complies with all twelve rules." Codd himself, in his book "The Relational Model for Database Management: Version 2", acknowledged that while his original set of 12 rules can be used for coarse distinctions, the 333 features of his Relational Model Version 2 (RM/V2) are needed for distinctions of a finer grain.

== Rules ==
Rule 0: The foundation rule:

For any system that is advertised as, or claimed to be, a relational data base management system, that system must be able to manage data bases entirely through its relational capabilities.

Rule 1: The information rule:

All information in a relational data base is represented explicitly at the logical level and in exactly one way – by values in tables.

Rule 2: The guaranteed access rule:

Each and every datum (atomic value) in a relational data base is guaranteed to be logically accessible by resorting to a combination of table name, primary key value and column name.

Rule 3: Systematic treatment of null values:

Null values (distinct from the empty character string or a string of blank characters and distinct from zero or any other number) are supported in fully relational DBMS for representing missing information and inapplicable information in a systematic way, independent of data type.

Rule 4: Dynamic online catalog based on the relational model:

The data base description is represented at the logical level in the same way as ordinary data, so that authorized users can apply the same relational language to its interrogation as they apply to the regular data.

Rule 5: The comprehensive data sublanguage rule:

A relational system may support several languages and various modes of terminal use (for example, the fill-in-the-blanks mode). However, there must be at least one language whose statements are expressible, per some well-defined syntax, as character strings and that is comprehensive in supporting all of the following items:

1. Data definition.
2. View definition.
3. Data manipulation (interactive and by program).
4. Integrity constraints.
5. Authorization.
6. Transaction boundaries (begin, commit and rollback).

Rule 6: The view updating rule:

All views that are theoretically updatable are also updatable by the system.

Rule 7: Relational operations rule / Possible for high-level insert, update, and delete:

The capability of handling a base relation or a derived relation as a single operand applies not only to the retrieval of data but also to the insertion, update and deletion of data.

Rule 8: Physical data independence:

Application programs and terminal activities remain logically unimpaired whenever any changes are made in either storage representations or access methods.

Rule 9: Logical data independence:

Application programs and terminal activities remain logically unimpaired when information-preserving changes of any kind that theoretically permit unimpairment are made to the base tables.

Rule 10: Integrity independence:

Integrity constraints specific to a particular relational data base must be definable in the relational data sublanguage and storable in the catalog, not in the application programs.

Rule 11: Distribution independence:

The end-user must not be able to see that the data is distributed over various locations. Users should always get the impression that the data is located at one site only.

Rule 12: The nonsubversion rule:

If a relational system has a low-level (single-record-at-a-time) language, that low level cannot be used to subvert or bypass the integrity rules and constraints expressed in the higher level relational language (multiple-records-at-a-time).

== See also ==
- IBM System R
