= Relational data mining =

Relational data mining is the data mining technique for relational databases. Unlike traditional data mining algorithms, which look for patterns in a single table (propositional patterns), relational data mining algorithms look for patterns among multiple tables (relational patterns). For most types of propositional patterns, there are corresponding relational patterns. For example, there are relational classification rules (relational classification), relational regression tree, and relational association rules.

There are several approaches to relational data mining:

1. Inductive Logic Programming (ILP)
2. Statistical Relational Learning (SRL)
3. Graph Mining
4. Propositionalization
5. Multi-view learning

== Algorithms ==
Multi-Relation Association Rules: Multi-Relation Association Rules (MRAR) is a new class of association rules which in contrast to primitive, simple and even multi-relational association rules (that are usually extracted from multi-relational databases), each rule item consists of one entity but several relations. These relations indicate indirect relationship between the entities. Consider the following MRAR where the first item consists of three relations live in, nearby and humid: “Those who live in a place which is near by a city with humid climate type and also are younger than 20 -> their health condition is good”. Such association rules are extractable from RDBMS data or semantic web data.

== Software ==
- Safarii: a Data Mining environment for analysing large relational databases based on a multi-relational data mining engine.
- Dataconda: a software, free for research and teaching purposes, that helps mining relational databases without the use of SQL.

== Datasets ==
- Relational dataset repository: a collection of publicly available relational datasets.

== See also ==
- Data mining
- Structure mining
- Database mining
