= Online complex processing =

Online complex processing (OLCP) is a class of realtime data processing involving complex queries, lengthy queries and/or simultaneous reads and writes to the same records.

== Sources ==
- http://www.pcmag.com/encyclopedia_term/0,2542,t=online+complex+processing&i=48345,00.asp

== See also ==
- Online transaction processing
- OLAP
- Transaction processing
