= Calculation =

Deliberate process that transforms inputs to outputs with variable change

A calculation is a deliberate mathematical process that transforms a plurality of inputs into a singular or plurality of outputs, known also as a result or results. The term is used in a variety of senses, from the very definite arithmetical calculation of using an algorithm, to the vague heuristics of calculating a strategy in a competition, or calculating the chance of a successful relationship between two people.

For example, multiplying 7 by 6 is a simple algorithmic calculation. Extracting the square root or the cube root of a number using mathematical models is a more complex algorithmic calculation.

Statistical estimations of the likely election results from opinion polls also involve algorithmic calculations, but produces ranges of possibilities rather than exact answers.

To calculate means to determine mathematically in the case of a number or amount, or in the case of an abstract problem to deduce the answer using logic, reason or common sense. The English word derives from the Latin calculus, which originally meant a pebble (from Latin calx), for instance the small stones used as a counters on an abacus (Latin: abacus, Greek: ἄβαξ, romanized: abax). The abacus was an instrument used by Greeks and Romans for arithmetic calculations, preceding the slide-rule and the electronic calculator, and consisted of perforated pebbles sliding on iron bars.

== See also ==
- Calculus (disambiguation) — list of general methods of calculation by application area
- Complexity class — theoretical notion to categorize calculability
- Cost accounting — business application of calculation
- List of algorithms — fully formalized, computer-executable methods of calculation
- Mental calculation — performing arithmetics using one's brain only
