= Domain relational calculus =

In computer science, domain relational calculus (DRC) is a calculus that was introduced by Michel Lacroix and Alain Pirotte as a declarative database query language for the relational data model.

In DRC, queries have the form:

$$\{\langle X_1, X_2, ...., X_n \rangle \mid p(\langle X_1, X_2, ...., X_n\rangle) \}$$

where each X_{i} is either a domain variable or constant, and $p(\langle X_1, X_2, ...., X_n \rangle)$ denotes a DRC formula. The result of the query is the set of tuples X_{1} to X_{n} that make the DRC formula true.

This language uses the same operators as tuple calculus, the logical connectives ∧ (and), ∨ (or) and ¬ (not). The existential quantifier (∃) and the universal quantifier (∀) can be used to bind the variables.

Its computational expressiveness is equivalent to that of relational algebra.

== Examples ==
Let (A, B, C) mean (Rank, Name, ID) in the Enterprise relation

and let (D, E, F) mean (Name, DeptName, ID) in the Department relation

All captains of the starship USS Enterprise:
$$\left\{ \ {\left\langle A, B, C \right\rangle} \mid {\left\langle A, B, C \right\rangle \in \mathrm{Enterprise} \ \land \ A = \mathrm{'Captain'} } \ \right\}$$

In this example, A, B, C denotes both the result set and a set in the table Enterprise.

Names of Enterprise crew members who are in Stellar Cartography:
$$\begin{align}
\{ {\left\langle B \right\rangle}
& \mid {\exists A, C \ \left\langle A, B, C \right\rangle \in \mathrm{Enterprise} } \\
& \land \ {\exists D, E, F \ \left\langle D, E, F \right\rangle \in \mathrm{Departments} } \\
& \land \ F = C \\
& \land \ E = \mathrm{'Stellar\ Cartography'} \} \\
\end{align}$$

In this example, we're only looking for the name, and that's B. The condition F = C is a requirement that describes the intersection of Enterprise crew members AND members of the Stellar Cartography Department.

An alternate representation of the previous example would be:
$$\begin{align}
\{ {\left\langle B \right\rangle}
& \mid {\exists A, C \ \left\langle A, B, C \right\rangle \in \mathrm{Enterprise} } \\
& \land \ {\exists D \ \left\langle D, \mathrm{'Stellar\ Cartography'}, C \right\rangle \in \mathrm{Departments} } \} \\
\end{align}$$

In this example, the value of the requested F domain is directly placed in the formula and the C domain variable is re-used in the query for the existence of a department, since it already holds a crew member's ID.

Both of them written in SQL will be like:

SELECT B
FROM Enterprise
JOIN Department
  ON F = C
 AND E = 'Stellar Cartography';

== See also ==
- Relational calculus
