= Relational algebra =

Theory of relational databases

In database theory, relational algebra is a theory that uses algebraic structures for modeling data and defining queries on it with well founded semantics. The theory was introduced by Edgar F. Codd as part of his relational model of data in 1970.

The main application of relational algebra is to provide a theoretical foundation for relational databases, particularly query languages for such databases, chief among which is SQL. Relational databases store tabular data represented as relations. Queries over relational databases often likewise return tabular data represented as relations.

The main purpose of relational algebra is to define operators that transform one or more input relations to an output relation. Given that these operators accept relations as input and produce relations as output, they can be combined and used to express complex queries that transform multiple input relations (whose data are stored in the database) into a single output relation (the query results).

Unary operators accept a single relation as input. Examples include operators to filter certain attributes (columns) or tuples (rows) from an input relation. Binary operators accept two relations as input and combine them into a single output relation. For example, taking all tuples found in either relation (union), removing tuples from the first relation found in the second relation (difference), extending the tuples of the first relation with tuples in the second relation matching certain conditions, and so forth.

== Introduction ==
A relation of arity n is a set of n‑tuples. Relational algebra operates on homogeneous sets of tuples, $S = \{(s_{j1},s_{j2}, ... s_{jn}) \mid j \in 1 ... m \},$ where an n‑tuple is a tuple (row; index j) (Note: relational algebra authors since Codd (inclusive) consistently use 'j' for the first index (tuple number; row) and 'i' for the second index (attribute position; column) and, as such, should not be confused with the positional grid indices typically used in matrices and tensors notation) with n 'types of attributes' (or data domains), thus m is the number of rows of tuples in a table and n is the number of columns (and all entries in each column have the same 'type').

A relation also has a unique tuple called the header which gives each column a unique name or attribute inside the relation. Attributes are used in projections and selections.

== Set operators ==
The relational algebra uses set union, set difference, and Cartesian product from set theory, and adds additional constraints to these operators to create new ones.

For set union and set difference, the two relations involved must be union-compatible—that is, the two relations must have the same set of attributes. Because set intersection is defined in terms of set union and set difference, the two relations involved in set intersection must also be union-compatible.

For the Cartesian product to be defined, the two relations involved must have disjoint headers (i.e. they must not have a common attribute name).

In addition, the Cartesian product is defined differently from the one in set theory, in the sense that tuples are considered to be "shallow" for the purposes of the operation. That means the Cartesian product of a set of n-tuples with a set of m-tuples yields a set of "flattened" $(n+m)$-tuples (whereas basic set theory would have prescribed a set of 2-tuples, each containing an n-tuple and an m-tuple). In relational algebra, the Cartesian product $R\times S$ is defined formally as

$$R\times S:=\{(r_1,r_2,\dots,r_n,s_1,s_2,\dots,s_m) \mid (r_1,r_2,\dots,r_n)\in R, (s_1,s_2,\dots,s_m)\in S\}$$

The cardinality of the Cartesian product is the product of the cardinalities of its factors, that is, |R × S| = |R| × |S|.

== Projection ==
A projection (Π) is a unary operation written as $\Pi_{a_1, \ldots,a_n}( R )$ where $a_1,\ldots,a_n$ is a set of attribute names. The result of such projection is defined as the set that is obtained when all tuples in R are restricted to the set $\{a_1,\ldots,a_n\}$.

Note: when implemented in SQL standard the "default projection" returns a multiset instead of a set, and the Π projection to eliminate duplicate data is obtained by the addition of the DISTINCT keyword.

== Selection ==
A selection (sometimes called a restriction in reference to E.F. Codd's 1970 paper and not, contrary to a popular belief, to avoid confusion with SQL's use of SELECT, since Codd's article predates the existence of SQL) is a unary operation that denotes a subset of a relation.

To obtain a listing of all friends or business associates in an address book, the selection might be written as
$$\sigma_{\text{isFriend = true} \,\lor\, \text{isBusinessContact = true}}( \text{addressBook} ).$$
The result would be a relation containing every attribute of every unique record where isFriend is true or where isBusinessContact is true.

A selection is written as $\sigma_{a \theta b}( R )$ or $\sigma_{a \theta v}( R )$ where:

- a and b are attribute names
- θ is a binary operation in the set $\{\;<, \le, =, \ne, \ge, \;>\}$
- v is a value constant
- R is a relation

The selection $\sigma_{a \theta b}( R )$ denotes all tuples in R for which θ holds between the a and the b attribute.

The selection $\sigma_{a \theta v}( R )$ denotes all tuples in R for which θ holds between the a attribute and the value v.

For an example, consider the following tables where the first table gives the relation Person, the second table gives the result of $\sigma_{\text{Age} \ge 34}( \text{Person} )$ and the third table gives the result of $\sigma_{\text{Age} = \text{Weight}}( \text{Person} )$.

$\text{Person}$

Name	Age	Weight
Harry	34	80
Sally	28	64
George	29	70
Helena	54	54
Peter	34	80

$\sigma_{\text{Age} \ge 34}( \text{Person} )$

Name	Age	Weight
Harry	34	80
Helena	54	54
Peter	34	80

$\sigma_{\text{Age} = \text{Weight}}( \text{Person} )$

Name	Age	Weight
Helena	54	54

More formally the semantics of the selection is defined as follows:

$$\sigma_{a \theta b}( R ) = \{\ t : t \in R,\ t(a) \ \theta \ t(b) \ \}$$

$$\sigma_{a \theta v}( R ) = \{\ t : t \in R,\ t(a) \ \theta \ v \ \}$$

The result of the selection is only defined if the attribute names that it mentions are in the heading of the relation that it operates upon.

=== Generalized selection ===
A generalized selection (σ) is a unary operation written as $\sigma_\varphi(R)$ where φ is a propositional formula that consists of atoms as allowed in the normal selection and the logical operators $\wedge$ (and), $\lor$ (or) and $\neg$ (negation). This selection selects all those tuples in R for which φ holds.

For an example, consider the following tables where the first table gives the relation Person and the second the result of $\sigma_{\text{Age} \ge 30 \ \land \ \text{Weight} \le 60}(\text{Person})$.

$\text{Person}$

Name	Age	Weight
Harry	34	80
Sally	28	64
George	29	70
Helena	54	54
Peter	34	80

$\sigma_{\text{Age} \ge 30 \ \land \ \text{Weight} \le 60}(\text{Person})$

Name	Age	Weight
Helena	54	54

Formally the semantics of the generalized selection is defined as follows:

$$\sigma_\varphi(R) = \{ \ t : t \in R, \ \varphi(t) \ \}$$

The result of the selection is only defined if the attribute names that it mentions are in the header of the relation that it operates upon.

The generalized selection is expressible with other basic algebraic operations. A simulation of generalized selection using the fundamental operators is defined by the following rules:

$$\sigma_{\varphi \land \psi}(R) = \sigma_\varphi(R) \cap \sigma_\psi(R)$$
$$\sigma_{\varphi \lor \psi}(R) = \sigma_\varphi(R) \cup \sigma_\psi(R)$$
$$\sigma_{\lnot \varphi}(R) = R - \sigma_\varphi(R)$$

=== Computer languages ===
In computer languages it is expected that any truth-valued expression be permitted as the selection condition rather than restricting it to be a simple comparison.

In SQL, selections are performed by using WHERE definitions in SELECT, UPDATE, and DELETE statements, but note that the selection condition can result in any of three truth values (true, false and unknown) instead of the usual two.

In SQL, general selections are performed by using WHERE definitions with AND, OR, or NOT operands in SELECT, UPDATE, and DELETE statements.

== Rename ==
A rename is a unary operation written as $\rho_{a/b}(R)$ where:

- R is a relation
- a and b are attribute names
- b is an attribute of R

To rename the "isFriend" attribute to "isBusinessContact" in a relation, $\rho_{\text{isBusinessContact / isFriend} } ( \text{addressBook} )$ might be used.

There is also the $\rho_{x(A_1, \ldots,A_n)}(R)$ notation, where R is renamed to x and the attributes $\{a_1,\ldots,a_n\}$ are renamed to $\{A_1,\ldots,A_n\}$.

The result is identical to R except that the b attribute in all tuples is renamed to a. For an example, consider the following invocation of ρ on an Employee relation and the result of that invocation:

$\text{Employee}$

Name	EmployeeId
Harry	3415
Sally	2241

$\rho_\text{EmployeeName/Name}(\text{Employee})$

EmployeeName	EmployeeId
Harry	3415
Sally	2241

Formally, the semantics of the rename operator is defined as follows:

$$\rho_{a/b}(R) = \{ \ t[a/b] : t \in R \ \},$$

where $t[a/b]$ is defined as the tuple t, with the b attribute renamed to a, so that:

$$t[a/b] = \{ \ (c, v) \ | \ ( c, v ) \in t, \ c \ne b \ \} \cup \{ \ (a, \ t(b) ) \ \}.$$

== Common extensions ==
In practice the classical relational algebra described above is extended with various operations such as outer joins, aggregate functions and even transitive closure.

=== Outer joins ===
Whereas the result of a join (or inner join) consists of tuples formed by combining matching tuples in the two operands, an outer join contains those tuples and additionally some tuples formed by extending an unmatched tuple in one of the operands by "fill" values for each of the attributes of the other operand. Outer joins are not considered part of the classical relational algebra discussed so far.

The operators defined in this section assume the existence of a null value, ω, which we do not define, to be used for the fill values; in practice this corresponds to the NULL in SQL. In order to make subsequent selection operations on the resulting table meaningful, a semantic meaning needs to be assigned to nulls; in Codd's approach the propositional logic used by the selection is extended to a three-valued logic, although we elide those details in this article.

Three outer join operators are defined: left outer join, right outer join, and full outer join. (The word "outer" is sometimes omitted.)

==== Left outer join ====
The left outer join (⟕) is written as R ⟕ S where R and S are relations. (Note: In Unicode, the Left outer join symbol is ⟕ (U+27D5).) The result of the left outer join is the set of all combinations of tuples in R and S that are equal on their common attribute names, in addition (loosely speaking) to tuples in R that have no matching tuples in S.

For an example consider the tables Employee and Dept and their left outer join:

Employee
Name	EmpId	DeptName
Harry	3415	Finance
Sally	2241	Sales
George	3401	Finance
Harriet	2202	Sales
Tim	1123	Executive

Dept
DeptName	Manager
Sales	Harriet
Production	Charles

Employee ⟕ Dept
Name	EmpId	DeptName	Manager
Harry	3415	Finance	ω
Sally	2241	Sales	Harriet
George	3401	Finance	ω
Harriet	2202	Sales	Harriet
Tim	1123	Executive	ω

In the resulting relation, tuples in S which have no common values in common attribute names with tuples in R take a null value, ω.

Since there are no tuples in Dept with a DeptName of Finance or Executive, ωs occur in the resulting relation where tuples in Employee have a DeptName of Finance or Executive.

Let r_{1}, r_{2}, ..., r_{n} be the attributes of the relation R and let {(ω, ..., ω)} be the singleton relation on the attributes that are unique to the relation S (those that are not attributes of R). Then the left outer join can be described in terms of the natural join (and hence using basic operators) as follows:

$$(R \bowtie S) \cup ((R - \pi_{r_1, r_2, \dots, r_n}(R \bowtie S)) \times \{(\omega, \dots, \omega)\})$$

==== Right outer join ====
The right outer join (⟖) behaves almost identically to the left outer join, but the roles of the tables are switched.

The right outer join of relations R and S is written as R ⟖ S. (Note: In Unicode, the Right outer join symbol is ⟖ (U+27D6).) The result of the right outer join is the set of all combinations of tuples in R and S that are equal on their common attribute names, in addition to tuples in S that have no matching tuples in R.

For example, consider the tables Employee and Dept and their right outer join:

Employee
Name	EmpId	DeptName
Harry	3415	Finance
Sally	2241	Sales
George	3401	Finance
Harriet	2202	Sales
Tim	1123	Executive

Dept
DeptName	Manager
Sales	Harriet
Production	Charles

Employee ⟖ Dept
Name	EmpId	DeptName	Manager
Sally	2241	Sales	Harriet
Harriet	2202	Sales	Harriet
ω	ω	Production	Charles

In the resulting relation, tuples in R which have no common values in common attribute names with tuples in S take a null value, ω.

Since there are no tuples in Employee with a DeptName of Production, ωs occur in the Name and EmpId attributes of the resulting relation where tuples in Dept had DeptName of Production.

Let s_{1}, s_{2}, ..., s_{n} be the attributes of the relation S and let {(ω, ..., ω)} be the singleton relation on the attributes that are unique to the relation R (those that are not attributes of S). Then, as with the left outer join, the right outer join can be simulated using the natural join as follows:

$$(R \bowtie S) \cup (\{(\omega, \dots, \omega)\} \times (S - \pi_{s_1, s_2, \dots, s_n}(R \bowtie S)))$$

==== Full outer join ====
The outer join (⟗) or full outer join in effect combines the results of the left and right outer joins.

The full outer join is written as R ⟗ S where R and S are relations. (Note: In Unicode, the Full Outer join symbol is ⟗ (U+27D7).) The result of the full outer join is the set of all combinations of tuples in R and S that are equal on their common attribute names, in addition to tuples in S that have no matching tuples in R and tuples in R that have no matching tuples in S in their common attribute names.

For an example consider the tables Employee and Dept and their full outer join:

Employee
Name	EmpId	DeptName
Harry	3415	Finance
Sally	2241	Sales
George	3401	Finance
Harriet	2202	Sales
Tim	1123	Executive

Dept
DeptName	Manager
Sales	Harriet
Production	Charles

Employee ⟗ Dept
Name	EmpId	DeptName	Manager
Harry	3415	Finance	ω
Sally	2241	Sales	Harriet
George	3401	Finance	ω
Harriet	2202	Sales	Harriet
Tim	1123	Executive	ω
ω	ω	Production	Charles

In the resulting relation, tuples in R which have no common values in common attribute names with tuples in S take a null value, ω. Tuples in S which have no common values in common attribute names with tuples in R also take a null value, ω.

The full outer join can be simulated using the left and right outer joins (and hence the natural join and set union) as follows:

R ⟗ S = (R ⟕ S) ∪ (R ⟖ S)

=== Operations for domain computations ===
There is nothing in relational algebra introduced so far that would allow computations on the data domains (other than evaluation of propositional expressions involving equality). For example, it is not possible using only the algebra introduced so far to write an expression that would multiply the numbers from two columns, e.g. a unit price with a quantity to obtain a total price. Practical query languages have such facilities, e.g. the SQL SELECT allows arithmetic operations to define new columns in the result SELECT unit_price * quantity AS total_price FROM t, and a similar facility is provided more explicitly by Tutorial D's EXTEND keyword. In database theory, this is called extended projection.

==== Aggregation ====
Furthermore, computing various functions on a column, like the summing up of its elements, is also not possible using the relational algebra introduced so far. There are five aggregate functions that are included with most relational database systems. These operations are Sum, Count, Average, Maximum and Minimum. In relational algebra the aggregation operation over a schema (A_{1}, A_{2}, ... A_{n}) is written as follows:

$$G_1, G_2, \ldots, G_m\ g_{f_1({A_1}'), f_2({A_2}'), \ldots, f_k({A_k}')}\ (r)$$

where each A_{j}′, 1 ≤ j ≤ k, is one of the original attributes A_{i}, 1 ≤ i ≤ n.

The attributes preceding the g are grouping attributes, which function like a "group by" clause in SQL. Then there are an arbitrary number of aggregation functions applied to individual attributes. The operation is applied to an arbitrary relation r. The grouping attributes are optional, and if they are not supplied, the aggregation functions are applied across the entire relation to which the operation is applied.

Let's assume that we have a table named Account with three columns, namely Account_Number, Branch_Name and Balance. We wish to find the maximum balance of each branch. This is accomplished by _{Branch_Name}G_{Max(Balance)}(Account). To find the highest balance of all accounts regardless of branch, we could simply write G_{Max(Balance)}(Account).

Grouping is often written as _{Branch_Name}ɣ_{Max(Balance)}(Account) instead.

=== Transitive closure ===
Although relational algebra seems powerful enough for most practical purposes, there are some simple and natural operators on relations that cannot be expressed by relational algebra. One of them is the transitive closure of a binary relation. Given a domain D, let binary relation R be a subset of D×D. The transitive closure R^{+} of R is the smallest subset of D×D that contains R and satisfies the following condition:

$$\forall x \forall y \forall z \left( (x,y) \in R^+ \wedge (y,z) \in R^+ \Rightarrow (x,z) \in R^+ \right)$$

It can be proved using the fact that there is no relational algebra expression E(R) taking R as a variable argument that produces R^{+}.

SQL however officially supports such fixpoint queries since 1999, and it had vendor-specific extensions in this direction well before that.

== Use of algebraic properties for query optimization ==
Two possible query plans for the triangle query $R(A, B) \bowtie S(B, C) \bowtie T(A, C)$; the first joins S and T first and joins the result with R, the second joins R and S first and joins the result with T

Relational database management systems often include a query optimizer which attempts to determine the most efficient way to execute a given query. Query optimizers enumerate possible query plans, estimate their cost, and pick the plan with the lowest estimated cost. If queries are represented by operators from relational algebra, the query optimizer can enumerate possible query plans by rewriting the initial query using the algebraic properties of these operators.

Queries can be represented as a tree, where

- the internal nodes are operators,
- leaves are relations,
- subtrees are subexpressions.

The primary goal of the query optimizer is to transform expression trees into equivalent expression trees, where the average size of the relations yielded by subexpressions in the tree is smaller than it was before the optimization. The secondary goal is to try to form common subexpressions within a single query, or if there is more than one query being evaluated at the same time, in all of those queries. The rationale behind the second goal is that it is enough to compute common subexpressions once, and the results can be used in all queries that contain that subexpression.

Here are a set of rules that can be used in such transformations.

=== Selection ===
Rules about selection operators play the most important role in query optimization. Selection is an operator that very effectively decreases the number of rows in its operand, so if the selections in an expression tree are moved towards the leaves, the internal relations (yielded by subexpressions) will likely shrink.

==== Basic selection properties ====
Selection is idempotent (multiple applications of the same selection have no additional effect beyond the first one), and commutative (the order selections are applied in has no effect on the eventual result).

1. $\sigma_{A}(R)=\sigma_{A}\sigma_{A}(R)\,\!$
2. $\sigma_{A}\sigma_{B}(R)=\sigma_{B}\sigma_{A}(R)\,\!$

==== Breaking up selections with complex conditions ====
A selection whose condition is a conjunction of simpler conditions is equivalent to a sequence of selections with those same individual conditions, and selection whose condition is a disjunction is equivalent to a union of selections. These identities can be used to merge selections so that fewer selections need to be evaluated, or to split them so that the component selections may be moved or optimized separately.

1. $\sigma_{A \land B}(R)=\sigma_{A}(\sigma_{B}(R))=\sigma_{B}(\sigma_{A}(R))$
2. $\sigma_{A \lor B}(R)=\sigma_{A}(R)\cup\sigma_{B}(R)$

==== Selection and cross product ====
Cross product is the costliest operator to evaluate. If the input relations have N and M rows, the result will contain $NM$ rows. Therefore, it is important to decrease the size of both operands before applying the cross product operator.

This can be effectively done if the cross product is followed by a selection operator, e.g. $\sigma_{A}(R \times P)$. Considering the definition of join, this is the most likely case. If the cross product is not followed by a selection operator, we can try to push down a selection from higher levels of the expression tree using the other selection rules.

In the above case the condition A is broken up in to conditions B, C and D using the split rules about complex selection conditions, so that $A = B \wedge C \wedge D$ and B contains attributes only from R, C contains attributes only from P, and D contains the part of A that contains attributes from both R and P. Note, that B, C or D are possibly empty. Then the following holds:

$$\sigma_{A}(R \times P) = \sigma_{B \wedge C \wedge D}(R \times P) = \sigma_{D}(\sigma_{B}(R) \times \sigma_{C}(P))$$

==== Selection and set operators ====
Selection is distributive over the set difference, intersection, and union operators. The following three rules are used to push selection below set operations in the expression tree. For the set difference and the intersection operators, it is possible to apply the selection operator to just one of the operands following the transformation. This can be beneficial where one of the operands is small, and the overhead of evaluating the selection operator outweighs the benefits of using a smaller relation as an operand.

1. $\sigma_{A}(R\setminus P)=\sigma_{A}(R)\setminus \sigma_{A}(P) =\sigma_{A}(R)\setminus P$
2. $\sigma_{A}(R\cup P)=\sigma_{A}(R)\cup\sigma_{A}(P)$
3. $\sigma_{A}(R\cap P)=\sigma_{A}(R)\cap\sigma_{A}(P)=\sigma_{A}(R)\cap P=R\cap \sigma_{A}(P)$

==== Selection and projection ====
Selection commutes with projection if and only if the fields referenced in the selection condition are a subset of the fields in the projection. Performing selection before projection may be useful if the operand is a cross product or join. In other cases, if the selection condition is relatively expensive to compute, moving selection outside the projection may reduce the number of tuples which must be tested (since projection may produce fewer tuples due to the elimination of duplicates resulting from omitted fields).

$$\pi_{a_1, \ldots ,a_n}(\sigma_A( R )) = \sigma_A(\pi_{a_1, \ldots,a_n}( R ))\,\,\text{if}\,A \subseteq \{a_1,\ldots,a_n\}$$

=== Projection ===
==== Basic projection properties ====
Projection is idempotent, so that a series of (valid) projections is equivalent to the outermost projection.

$$\begin{align}&\pi_{a_1, \ldots , a_n}(\pi_{b_1,\ldots , b_m}(R)) = \pi_{a_1, \ldots , a_n}(R)\\[4pt] &\,\,\,\text{where}\,\,\{a_1, \ldots , a_n\} \subseteq \{b_1, \ldots , b_m\}\end{align}$$

==== Projection and set operators ====
Projection is distributive over set union.

$$\pi_{a_1, \ldots, a_n}(R \cup P) = \pi_{a_1, \ldots, a_n}(R) \cup \pi_{a_1, \ldots, a_n}(P). \,$$

Projection does not distribute over intersection and set difference. Counterexamples are given by:

$$\begin{align}
\pi_A(\{ \langle A=a, B=b \rangle \} \cap \{ \langle A=a, B=b' \rangle \}) &= \emptyset
\\
\pi_A(\{ \langle A=a, B=b \rangle \}) \cap \pi_A(\{ \langle A=a, B=b' \rangle \}) &= \{ \langle A=a \rangle \}
\end{align}$$

and

$$\begin{align}
\pi_A(\{ \langle A=a, B=b \rangle \} \setminus \{ \langle A=a, B=b' \rangle \}) &= \{ \langle A=a\rangle \}
\\
\pi_A(\{ \langle A=a, B=b \rangle \}) \setminus \pi_A(\{ \langle A=a, B=b' \rangle \}) &= \emptyset
\end{align}$$

where b is assumed to be distinct from b'.

=== Rename ===
==== Basic rename properties ====
Successive renames of a variable can be collapsed into a single rename. Rename operations which have no variables in common can be arbitrarily reordered with respect to one another, which can be exploited to make successive renames adjacent so that they can be collapsed.

1. $\rho_{a / b}(\rho_{b / c}(R)) = \rho_{a / c}(R)\,\!$
2. $\rho_{a / b}(\rho_{c / d}(R)) = \rho_{c / d}(\rho_{a / b}(R))\,\!$

==== Rename and set operators ====
Rename is distributive over set difference, union, and intersection.

1. $\rho_{a / b}(R \setminus P) = \rho_{a / b}(R) \setminus \rho_{a / b}(P)$
2. $\rho_{a / b}(R \cup P) = \rho_{a / b}(R) \cup \rho_{a / b}(P)$
3. $\rho_{a / b}(R \cap P) = \rho_{a / b}(R) \cap \rho_{a / b}(P)$

=== Product and union ===
Cartesian product is distributive over union.

1. $(A \times B) \cup (A \times C) = A \times (B \cup C)$

== Implementations ==
The first query language to be based on Codd's algebra was Alpha, developed by Dr. Codd himself. Subsequently, ISBL was created, and this pioneering work has been acclaimed by many authorities as having shown the way to make Codd's idea into a useful language. Business System 12 was a short-lived industry-strength relational DBMS that followed the ISBL example.

In 1998 Chris Date and Hugh Darwen proposed a language called Tutorial D intended for use in teaching relational database theory, and its query language also draws on ISBL's ideas. Rel is an implementation of Tutorial D. Bmg is an implementation of relational algebra in Ruby which closely follows the principles of Tutorial D and The Third Manifesto.

Even the query language of SQL is loosely based on a relational algebra, though the operands in SQL (tables) are not exactly relations and several useful theorems about the relational algebra do not hold in the SQL counterpart (arguably to the detriment of optimisers and/or users). The SQL table model is a bag (multiset), rather than a set. For example, the expression $(R \cup S) \setminus T = (R \setminus T) \cup (S \setminus T)$ is a theorem for relational algebra on sets, but not for relational algebra on bags.

== See also ==
- Cartesian product
- Codd's theorem
- D4 (programming language) (an implementation of D)
- Data modeling
- Database
- Datalog
- Logic of relatives
- Object-role modeling
- Projection (mathematics)
- Projection (relational algebra)
- Projection (set theory)
- Relation
- Relation (database)
- Relation algebra
- Relational calculus
- Relation composition
- Relational database
- Relational model
- SQL
- Theory of relations
- Triadic relation
- Tuple relational calculus
