= Edgar F. Codd =

English computer scientist

Edgar "Ted" Codd
- Born: Edgar Frank Codd; 19 August 1923; Fortuneswell, Dorset, England
- Died: 18 April 2003 (aged 79); Williams Island, Aventura, Florida, USA
- Education: Exeter College, Oxford (BA); University of Michigan (MA, PhD)
- Known for: Alpha language Database normalization OLAP; Relational model Codd's cellular automaton Codd's theorem Codd's 12 rules Boyce–Codd normal form
- Awards: Turing Award (1981)
- Scientific career
- Fields: Computer Science
- Workplaces: University of Oxford; University of Michigan; IBM
- Thesis: Propagation, Computation, and Construction in Two-dimensional cellular spaces (1965)
- Doctoral advisor: John Henry Holland

Edgar Frank "Ted" Codd (19 August 1923 – 18 April 2003) was a British computer scientist who, while working for IBM, invented the relational model for database management, the theoretical basis for relational databases and relational database management systems. He won the 1981 ACM Turing Award.

== Biography ==
Edgar Frank Codd was born in Fortuneswell, on the Isle of Portland in Dorset, England. After attending Poole Grammar School, he studied mathematics and chemistry at Exeter College, Oxford, before serving as a pilot in the RAF Coastal Command during the Second World War, flying Sunderlands. In 1948, he moved to New York to work for IBM as a mathematical programmer. Codd first worked for the company's Selective Sequence Electronic (SSEC) project and was later involved in the development of IBM 701 and 702.

In 1953, dismayed by Senator Joseph McCarthy, Codd moved to Ottawa, Ontario, Canada. In 1957, he returned to the US working for IBM and from 1961 to 1965 pursuing his doctorate in computer science at the University of Michigan in Ann Arbor. Two years later, he moved to San Jose, California, to work at IBM's San Jose Research Laboratory, where he continued to work until the 1980s. He was appointed IBM Fellow in 1976. During the 1990s, his health deteriorated and he ceased work.

Codd received the Turing Award in 1981, and in 1994 he was inducted as a Fellow of the Association for Computing Machinery.

Codd died of heart failure at his home in Williams Island, Florida, at the age of 79 on 18 April 2003.

== Work ==
Codd received a PhD in 1965 from the University of Michigan, Ann Arbor, advised by John Henry Holland. His thesis was about self-replication in cellular automata, extending on work of von Neumann and showing that a set of eight states was sufficient for universal computation and construction. His design for a self-replicating computer was implemented only in 2010.

In the 1960s and 1970s, he worked out his theories of data management, issuing his paper "A Relational Model of Data for Large Shared Data Banks" in 1970, after an internal IBM paper one year earlier. To his disappointment, IBM proved slow to exploit his suggestions until commercial rivals started implementing them.

Initially, IBM refused to implement the relational model to preserve revenue from IMS/DB, a hierarchical database the company promoted in the 1970s. Codd then showed IBM customers the potential of the implementation of its model, and they, in turn, pressured IBM. Then IBM included in its Future Systems project a System R subproject – but put in charge of it developers who were not thoroughly familiar with Codd's ideas, and isolated the team from Codd. As a result, they did not use Codd's own Alpha language but created a non-relational one, SEQUEL. Even so, SEQUEL was so superior to pre-relational systems that in 1979 it was copied by Larry Ellison, based on pre-launch papers presented at conferences of Relational Software Inc, in his Oracle Database, which actually reached the market before SQL/DS – because of the then-already proprietary status of the original name, SEQUEL had to be renamed to SQL.

Codd continued to develop and extend his relational model, sometimes in collaboration with Christopher J. Date. One of the normalised forms, the Boyce–Codd normal form, is named after him.

Codd's theorem, a result proven in his seminal work on the relational model, equates the expressive power of relational algebra and relational calculus.

As the relational model became fashionable in the early 1980s, Codd fought a sometimes bitter campaign to prevent the term from being misused by database vendors who had merely added a relational veneer to older technology. As part of this campaign, he published his 12 rules to define what constituted a relational database. This made his position at IBM increasingly difficult, so he left to form a consulting company with Chris Date and others.

Codd coined the term Online analytical processing (OLAP) and wrote the "twelve laws of online analytical processing". Controversy erupted, however, after it was discovered that this paper had been sponsored by Arbor Software (subsequently Hyperion, now acquired by Oracle), a conflict of interest that had not been disclosed, and Computerworld withdrew the paper.

In 2004, SIGMOD renamed its highest prize to the SIGMOD Edgar F. Codd Innovations Award, in his honour.

== Publications ==
- Codd, Edgar Frank (1968). Cellular Automata. Academic Press. LCCN 68-23486.
- ——— (1970). "Relational Completeness of Data Base Sublanguages". Database Systems: 65–98.
- ——— (9 November 1981). "1981 Turing Award Lecture – Relational Database: A Practical Foundation for Productivity". Communications of the ACM. 25 (2): 109–17. doi:10.1145/358396.358400. S2CID 207577282.
- ——— (1990). The Relational Model for Database Management (Version 2 ed.). Addison Wesley Publishing. ISBN 978-0-201-14192-4.
- ———; Codd, S. B.; Salley, C. T. (1993). "Providing OLAP to User-Analysts: An IT Mandate" (PDF). Archived (PDF) from the original on 7 November 2005.

== See also ==
- Hugh Darwen
- Database normalization
- List of pioneers in computer science
- Relational Model/Tasmania (RM/T)
