= Row (database) =

Record in a relational database table

In a relational database, a row or "record" or "tuple", represents a single, implicitly structured data item in a table. A database table can be thought of as consisting of rows and columns. Each row in a table represents a set of related data, and every row in the table has the same structure.

For example, in a table that represents companies, each row might represent a single company. Columns might represent things like company name, address, etc. In a table that represents the association of employees with departments, each row would associate one employee with one department.

The implicit structure of a row, and the meaning of the data values in a row, requires that the row be understood as providing a succession of data values, one in each column of the table. The row is then interpreted as a relvar composed of a set of tuples, with each tuple consisting of the two items: the name of the relevant column and the value this row provides for that column.

Each column expects a data value of a particular type.

For example, one column might require a unique identifier, another might require text representing a person's name, another might require an integer representing hourly pay in dollars.
