= Christopher J. Date =

British database researcher (born 1941)

Chris Date
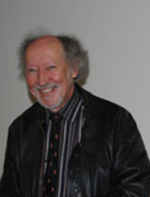
- Born: 18 January 1941 (age 85); Watford, England
- Education: University of Cambridge
- Occupations: Author, lecturer, researcher and consultant, specializing in relational database theory
- Employer: (until 1983) IBM
- Known for: Relational database theory

Christopher John Date (born 18 January 1941) is a British independent author, lecturer, researcher and consultant, specialising in relational database theory.

== Biography ==
Chris Date attended High Wycombe Royal Grammar School from 1951 to 1958 and received his BA in Mathematics from Cambridge University in 1962. He entered the computer business as a mathematical programmer at Leo Computers Ltd. (London), where he quickly moved into education and training. In 1966, he earned his master's degree at Cambridge, and, in 1967, he joined IBM Hursley (UK) as a computer programming instructor. Between 1969 and 1974, he was a principal instructor in IBM's European education program.

While working at IBM he was involved in technical planning and design for the IBM products SQL/DS and DB2. He was also involved with Edgar F. Codd's relational model for database management. He left IBM in 1983 and has written extensively of the relational model, in association with Hugh Darwen.

As of 2007 his book An Introduction to Database Systems, currently in its 8th edition, has sold well over 700,000 copies, not counting translations, and is used by several hundred colleges and universities worldwide.

He is also the author of many other books on data management, most notably Databases, Types, and the Relational Model, subtitled and commonly referred to as The Third Manifesto, currently in its third edition (note that earlier editions were titled differently, but maintained the same subtitle), a proposal for the future direction of DBMSs.

== Works ==
Chris Date is the author of several books, including:

- Several volumes of Relational Database Writings: ISBN 0-201-39814-1, ISBN 0-201-82459-0, ISBN 0-201-54303-6, ISBN 0-201-50881-8.
- A Guide to the SQL standard, 4th ed., Addison Wesley, USA 1997, ISBN 978-0-201-96426-4
- What Not How: The Business Rules Approach to Application Development, 2000, ISBN 0-201-70850-7
- The Database Relational Model: A Retrospective Review and Analysis, 2001, ISBN 0-201-61294-1
- Temporal Data & the Relational Model, 2003, ISBN 1-55860-855-9
- An Introduction to Database Systems, 2004, ISBN 0-321-19784-4
- Database in Depth: Relational Theory for Practitioners, 2005, ISBN 0-596-10012-4
- Databases, Types, and the Relational Model, The Third Manifesto (with Hugh Darwen), 2007, ISBN 0-321-39942-0
- SQL and Relational Theory, 2nd Edition: How to Write Accurate SQL Code, 2011, ISBN 1-4493-1640-9.

In recent years he has published articles with Fabian Pascal at Database Debunkings.

== See also ==
- Nikos Lorentzos
- David McGoveran
- Fabian Pascal
- Lex de Haan
