= Hugh Darwen =

English academic and writer about computers

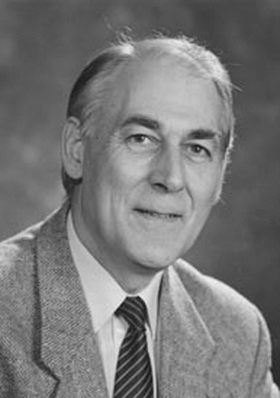
- Born: 1943 (age 82–83); Warwick, England,
- Occupations: author, lecturer, researcher, and consultant, specializing in relational database theory
- Employer: (until 2004) IBM
- Known for: Relational database theory

Hugh Darwen is a computer scientist who was an employee of IBM United Kingdom from 1967 to 2004, and has been involved in the development of the relational model.

== Work ==
From 1978 to 1982 he was a chief architect on Business System 12, a database management system that faithfully embraced the principles of the relational model. He worked closely with Christopher J. Date and represented IBM at the ISO SQL committees (JTC1 SC32 WG3 Database languages, WG4 SQL/MM) until his retirement from IBM. Darwen is the author of The Askew Wall and co-author of The Third Manifesto, a proposal for serving object-oriented programs with purely relational databases without compromising either side and getting the best of both worlds, arguably even better than with so-called object-oriented databases.

From 2004 to 2013 he lectured on relational databases at the Department of Computer Science, University of Warwick (UK), and from 1989 to 2014 was a tutor and consultant for the Open University (UK) where he was awarded a MUniv honorary degree for academic and scholarly distinction. He was also awarded a DTech (Doctor in Technology) honorary degree by the University of Wolverhampton. He later taught a database language designed by Chris Date and himself called Tutorial D, part of a proposed family of database query languages called "D".

== Bridge ==
He has written several books on the card game bridge, all on the subject of double dummy problems, on which he has a website, www.doubledummy.net, containing over 1500 problems from the late nineteenth century to the present day. Alan Truscott has called him "the world's leading authority" on composed bridge problems. He was responsible for the double dummy column in Bridge Magazine and other UK bridge publications from 1965 to 2004. Since then he has continued to run solving competitions every month at the aforementioned website. In 2026 the International Bridge Press Association made him the first recipient of the John H. Lindsay II Bridge-Analysis Award in recgnition of his contribution over 60 years.

== Publications ==
His early works were published under the pseudonym of Andrew Warden: both names are anagrams of his surname.

- Darwen, Hugh (1973), Bridge Magic: double dummy problems, single dummy, sure tricks, curios and inferentials – and a monograph on squeezes, London: Faber & Faber, ISBN 978-0-571-10250-1, 213 pp. OCLC 461769096
- Darwen, Hugh (2021), A Compendium of Double Dummy Problems, double dummy bridge problems from 1896 to 2005, Toronto: Master Point Press, ISBN 978-1-77140-244-6, 331 pp. OCLC 1284983633
- Darwen, Hugh (2023), Double Dummy Problems in The 21st Century, Volume One: Difficulty Ratings 1-4, Toronto: Master Point Press, ISBN 978-1-77140-270-5, 259 pp. *
- Darwen, Hugh (2025), Double Dummy Problems in The 21st Century, Volume Two: Difficulty Ratings 5-8, Toronto: Master Point Press, ISBN 978-1-77140-257-6, 229 pp. *
- ———————— (January 2006) [2005], The Askew Wall: SQL and The Relational Model (background to The Third Manifesto) (PDF), UK: University of Warwick
- ———————— (January 2009), An Introduction to Relational Database Theory (3rd ed.), BookBoon, ISBN 978-87-7681-500-4, 231 pp.
- ———————— (November 2012), SQL: A Comparative Survey (2nd ed.), BookBoon, ISBN 978-87-403-0778-8, 169 pp.
- Date, Christopher J.; Darwen, Hugh (March 1995), "The Third Manifesto", ACM SIGMOD Record, 24 (1), New York: ACM Press: 39–49, doi:10.1145/202660.202667, ISSN 0163-5808, S2CID 12145199, archived from the original (PostScript) on 19 March 2012
- ————————; Darwen, Hugh (August 1998), "Preview of The Third Manifesto", Database Programming & Design, According to Date, 11 (8), San Francisco: Miller Freeman, ISSN 0895-4518, OCLC 89297479, 67 pp.
- ————————; Darwen, Hugh (1998), Foundation for Object/Relational Databases: The Third Manifesto: a detailed study of the impact of objects and type theory on the relational model of data including a comprehensive proposal for type inheritance (1st ed.), Reading, MA: Addison-Wesley, ISBN 0-201-30978-5, LCCN 98010364, OCLC 38431501, LCC QA76.9.D3 D15994 1998, 496 pp.
- ————————; Darwen, Hugh (2000), Foundation for Future Database Systems: The Third Manifesto: a detailed study of the impact of type theory on the relational model of data, including a comprehensive model of type inheritance (2nd ed.), Reading: Addison-Wesley Professional, ISBN 0-201-70928-7, LCCN 00035527, OCLC 43662285, LCC QA76.9.D3 D3683 2000, 547 pp.
- ————————; Darwen, Hugh; Lorentzos, Nikos A. (2003), Temporal Data and the Relational Model: a detailed investigation into the application of interval and relation theory to the problem of temporal database management (1st ed.), San Diego: Morgan Kaufmann, ISBN 1-55860-855-9, LCCN 2002110398, OCLC 51453450, LCC QA76.9.D3 D3729 2003, 422 pp.
- ————————; Darwen, Hugh (2006), Databases, Types and The Relational Model: the Third Manifesto (3rd ed.), Reading: Addison-Wesley, ISBN 0-321-39942-0, OCLC 70044091, 572 pp.
- ————————; Darwen, Hugh (July 2010), Database Explorations: Essays on the Third Manifesto and Related Topics, Trafford, ISBN 978-1-4269-3723-1, 548 pp.
