= Union of Independent Grandes Écoles =

Union des grandes écoles indépendantes
- Motto: L'indépendance au service de l'excellence
- Motto in English: Independence for excellence
- Type: Non-profit association
- Established: 1993
- President: Etienne Craye
- Students: 81000
- Location: Paris, Île-de-France, France
- Website: ugei.fr

The Union of Independent Grandes Écoles (French: Union des grandes écoles indépendantes, UGEI) is an association of French private grandes écoles formed in 1993.

Its goal, according to its founders, is to bring together engineering grandes écoles and business schools which share the same desire for independence. As of 2022, it had 38 members.

== Business schools ==
- EBS Paris - European Business School Paris
- EDC Paris Business School
- Ecole de Management Léonard De Vinci
- ESCE - ESCE International Business School
- École de management de Normandie
- Groupe École supérieure de commerce de Troyes
- Excelia Group
- Montpellier Business School
- ICD - Institut international du commerce et du développement
- INSEEC - INSEEC Business School
- IPAG Business School
- ISC Paris - Institut supérieur du commerce de Paris
- ISG - ISG Business School
- PSB - Paris School of Business

== Engineering grandes écoles ==
- EBI - École de Biologie Industrielle
- ECE Paris - École centrale d'électronique
- EFREI
- EI CESI
- EIGSI - École d'ingénieurs généralistes La Rochelle
- ELISA Aerospace - École d'ingénieurs des sciences aérospatiales
- EPITA - École pour l'informatique et les techniques avancées
- EPF School of Engineering
- ESB - École supérieure du bois
- ESIGELEC
- ESIEA - École supérieure d'informatique, électronique, automatique
- ESILV - Leonardo da Vinci Engineering School
- École supérieure d'ingénieurs des travaux de la construction de Paris
- École supérieure d'ingénieurs des travaux de la construction de Caen
- École supérieure d'ingénieurs des travaux de la construction de Metz
- ESME-Sudria
- ESTACA - École supérieure des techniques aéronautiques et de construction automobile
- ESTP - École Spéciale des Travaux Publics
- 3IL - The Limoges Computer Sciences Engineering School
- IPSA - Institut polytechnique des sciences avancées
- Sup'Biotech - Institut Sup'Biotech de Paris
- ITECH Lyon - Institut textile et chimique de Lyon

== Other ==
- ESMOD
- Strate School of Design
