= Simoncelli =

Simoncelli is an Italian surname. Notable people with the surname include:

- Andrew Simoncelli, American associate professor
- Davide Simoncelli (born 1979), Italian skier
- Daniele Simoncelli (born 1989), Italian football player
- Eero Simoncelli, American computational neuroscientist
- Girolamo Simoncelli (1522–1605), Italian cardinal
- Girolamo Simoncelli (1817–1852), Italian political and military leader
- Marco Simoncelli (1987–2011), Italian motorcycle racer
- Stefano Simoncelli (1946–2013), Italian fencer
- Tania Simoncelli, American scientist

== Places ==
- Misano World Circuit Marco Simoncelli, a motorsport racetrack in Misano Adriatico
