= Potsdam University =

Potsdam University may refer to:

- University of Potsdam, Germany
- State University of New York at Potsdam, USA
