= Leonardo da Vinci University Center =

Higher education institution in La Défense, France

Coordinates: 48°53′46.094″N 2°14′12.127″E

- Pôle universitaire Léonard-de-Vinci
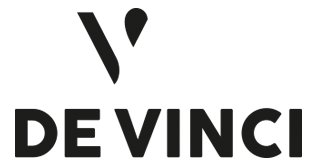
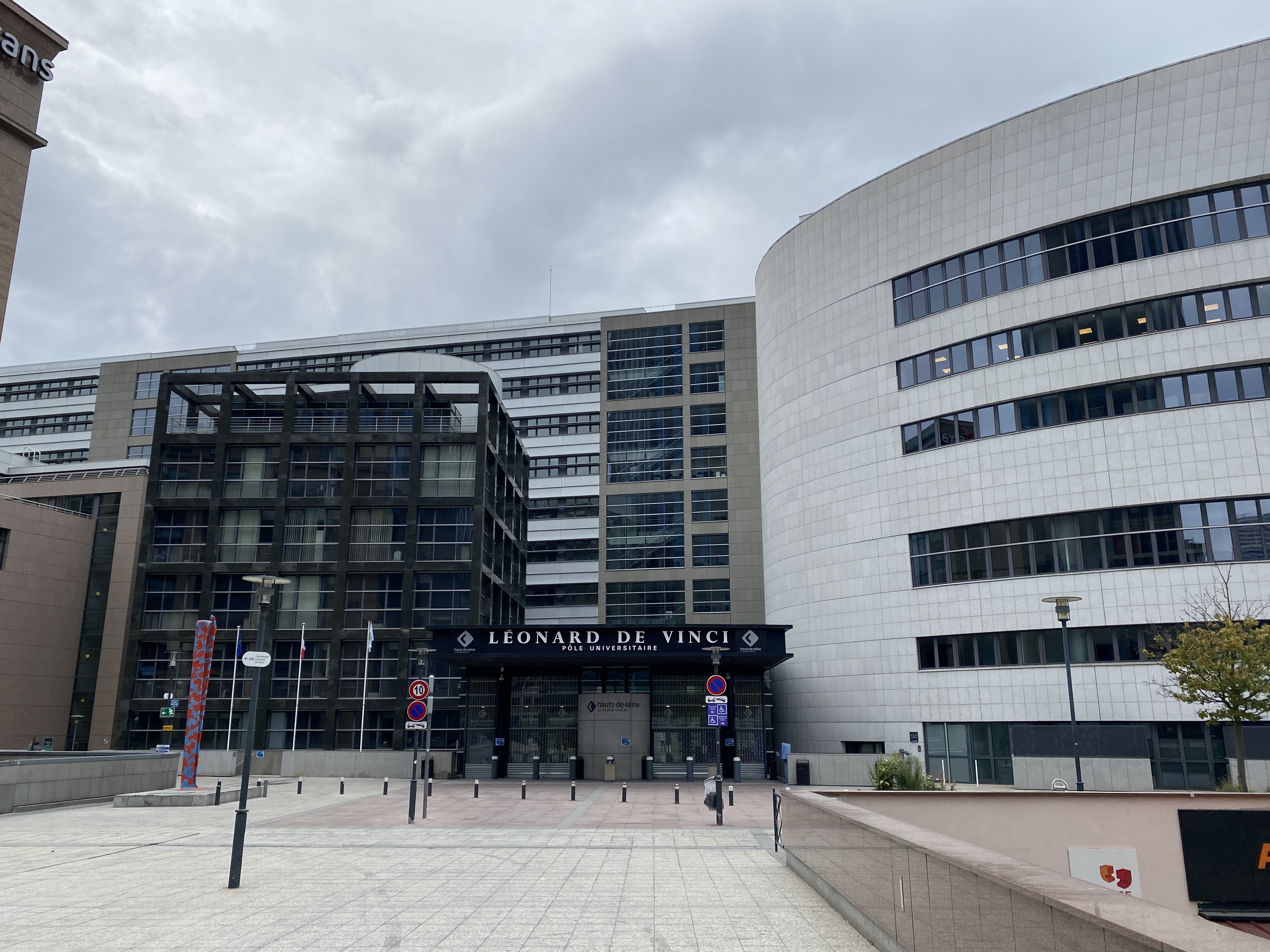
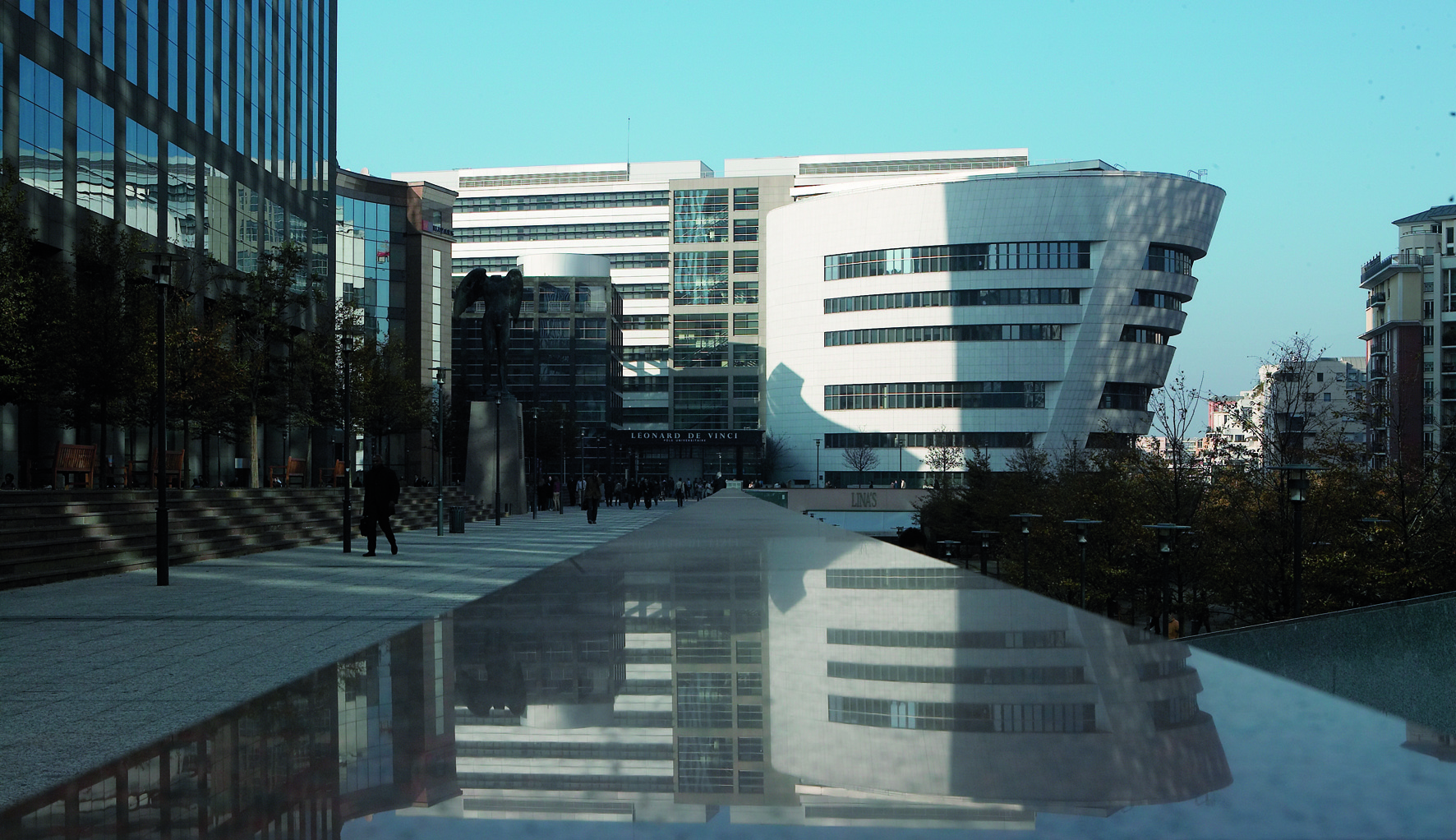
- Other names: Pasqua University, Leonardo da Vinci University
- Motto: Aller plus loin
- Motto in English: Go further
- Type: Private
- Established: 1995
- Founders: Charles Pasqua
- Affiliations: Couperin
- President: Pascal Brouaye
- Academic staff: 180
- Students: 10,000
- Location: La Défense, France, Île-de-France, France
- Campus: Urban
- Website: devinci.fr

The Leonardo de Vinci University Center (French: Pôle universitaire Léonard-de-Vinci) is a French private university cluster located at La Défense.

== History ==
The Leonardo de Vinci University Center, a higher education University center, has been created in 1995 by the Hauts-de-Seine general council, managed by Charles Pasqua: it is thus often colloquially nicknamed the “Pasqua University" (Fac Pasqua).

The cluster was a private French higher education. Originally, it was financed mainly by public funds. The cluster is now managed by the Leonardo da Vinci Association (ALDV) and no longer receives any subsidy from the Hauts-de-Seine. The cluster has been managed by Pascal Brouaye since 2012.

The Leonardo de Vinci University Center has been EESPIG certified since January 10, 2018 to January 10, 2023.

== Organisation and administration ==
The Leonardo de Vinci University Center is a building belonging to the Hauts-de-Seine department inside which there are several occupants who have signed an annual precarious occupation agreement with the Hauts-de-Seine department:

- Devinci Higher Education made up of four schools and educational departments and transversal administrative services. Devinci Higher Education also has a subsidiary specializing in continuing education and business services, and an apprenticeship training center.
  - EMLV Business School De Vinci
  - ESILV Engineering School De Vinci
  - IIM Digital School De Vinci
  - Leonardo da Vinci Institute
- Paris-Dauphine University
- Paris-Nanterre University
- CFA Sup de Vinci

== Notable faculty ==
- Oliver Günther, President of the University of Potsdam;
- Andrew Simoncelli, professor of Mass communication.
