= Eugene Wong =

Chinese-American computer scientist and mathematician

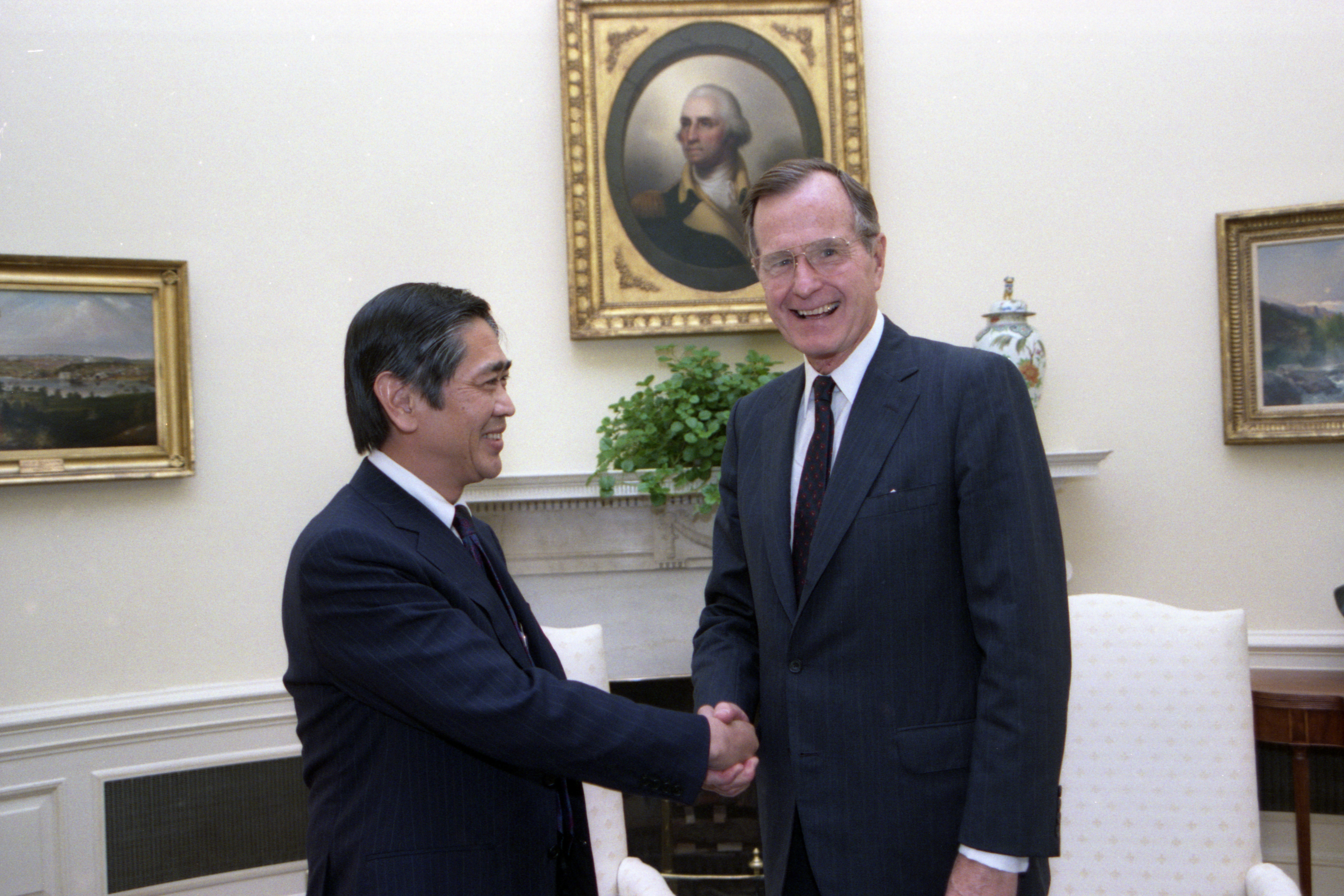
- Eugene Wong shaking hands with President George H.W. Bush on July 26, 1990 in the Oval Office.
- Born: December 24, 1934 (age 91); Nanjing, China
- Education: Princeton University (BS, MS, PhD)
- Spouse: Joan Chang
- Awards: Academician of Academia Sinica; 1988 ACM Software System Award; Member of National Academy of Engineering, 1987; Fellow of American Academy of Arts and Sciences, 1980; IEEE Fellow, 1974; 1968 Guggenheim Fellow
- Scientific career
- Workplaces: University of California, Berkeley; IBM; University of Cambridge
- Thesis: Vector Stochastic Processes in Problems of Communication Theory (1959)
- Doctoral advisor: John B. Thomas
- Doctoral students: Bruce Hajek; Yannis Ioannidis; Randy Katz; R. C. T. Lee; Caro Lucas

Eugene Wong (born December 24, 1934, in Nanjing, China) is a Chinese-American computer scientist and mathematician. Wong's career has spanned academia, university administration, government and the private sector. Together with Michael Stonebraker and a group of scientists at IBM, Wong is credited with pioneering database research in the 1970s from which software developed by IBM, Microsoft, and Oracle descends. Wong retired in 1994, since then holding the title of Professor Emeritus of Electrical Engineering and Computer Sciences at University of California, Berkeley.

The IEEE, as part of an award citation, wrote that Wong "is known for the extraordinary breadth of his accomplishments" and "for leadership in national and international engineering research and technology policy, for pioneering contributions in relational databases."

== Ingres ==
In 1973, Michael Stonebraker and his colleague Eugene Wong, having read Edgar F. Codd's work regarding the relational data model, began their own research into the topic.

When "The Design and Implementation of Ingres" (Interactive graphics and retrieval system) was published in 1976, two other names, Peter Kreps and Gerald Held, were listed as authors. As algorithms were defined and implemented, the list grew: "the Wong-Youssefi algorithm."

== Biography ==
After escaping war-torn mainland China in 1947, Wong and his family settled in New York City. After graduating from Forest Hills High School with highest Honors, Wong enrolled at Princeton University where he received his B.S. (1955), master's (1958) and PhD (1959) in electrical engineering. He was a post-doctoral student at the University of Cambridge until 1960 and from 1960 to 1962 a researcher at IBM's Thomas J. Watson Research Center. He joined the Berkeley faculty in 1962, where he later served as chair of the Department of Electrical Engineering and Computer Sciences. His research interests are in stochastic systems and database management. He has mentored 21 PhD students, including:

- Bruce Hajek, Leonard C. and Mary Lou Hoeft Chair in Engineering at UIUC, known for work in communication networks and random processes,
- Yannis Ioannidis, Professor of Informatics and Telecommunications at the National and Kapodistrian University of Athens,
- Oliver Günther, President of the University of Potsdam,
- Randy Katz, United Microelectronics Corporation Distinguished Professor in Electrical Engineering and Computer Science at Berkeley,
- R. C. T. Lee, professor at National Chi Nan University and co-author of book Symbolic Logic and Mechanical Theorem Proving, and
- Caro Lucas (1949–2010), former professor of electrical and computer engineering at the University of Tehran known for work in intelligent systems and robotics.

With the late Moshe Zakai, he originated a line of study in stochastic calculus now known as Wong-Zakai theory. Wong was a co-designer of Ingres, one of the first modern database systems and co-author on a major text on stochastic processes.

From 1990 to 1993, Wong served as associate director of the White House Office of Science and Technology Policy, and from 1998 to 2000 he headed the Engineering Directorate of the National Science Foundation. He chaired the Council of Advisors on Innovation and Technology in Hong Kong (2002–2004) and was a long-time international advisor on science and technology to the prime minister of Taiwan (2002–2011), where he led a major science policy study, Foresight Taiwan (2007–2010).

He was a co-founder of Ingres Corporation and a former president and CEO of Versata, Inc. Currently, he is a member of the board of directors of Hyster-Yale, Inc.

== Personal life ==
Wong was married to the former Joan Chang from 1956 until her death in 2006. He has 2 surviving grown children, 6 grandchildren, and 4 great-grandchildren. Wong resides in Berkeley, California.

== Awards and honors ==
- 1974: IEEE Fellow
- 1980: American Academy of Arts and Sciences Fellow
- 1987: National Academy of Engineering Fellow
- 1988: The ACM Software System Award for Ingres (together with Gerald Held and Michael Stonebraker)
- 1994: Berkeley Citation, the highest award for the school's faculty
- 2005: IEEE Founders Medal
- Academician of Academia Sinica
- Foreign member of the Royal Swedish Academy of Engineering Sciences
