= Bruce Hajek =

American electrical engineer

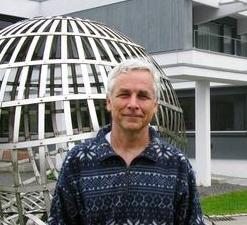
- Bruce Hajek at Oberwolfach, 2010
- Born: Bruce Edward Hajek; August 20, 1955 (age 71); Elmhurst, Illinois
- Title: Head of ECE department Leonard C. and Mary Lou Hoeft Endowed Chair in Engineering; Professor, ECE; Professor, CSL; Professor, Center for Advanced Study
- Spouse: Beth Scheid
- Awards: 2003 Kobayashi Award; Member of National Academy of Engineering, 1999; IEEE Fellow, 1989

Academic background
- Education: Willowbrook High School; UIUC (BS, MS)
- Alma mater: UC Berkeley (PhD)
- Thesis: Stochastic Integration, Markov Property and Measure Transformation of Random Fields (1979)
- Doctoral advisor: Eugene Wong

Academic work
- Discipline: Electrical and computer engineering
- Sub-discipline: Communication networks Random processes
- Institutions: University of Illinois Urbana-Champaign
- Doctoral students: Arvind Krishna
- Website: http://hajek.ece.illinois.edu/

Bruce Edward Hajek (born August 20, 1955) is a professor in the Coordinated Science Laboratory, the head of the Department of Electrical and Computer Engineering, and the Leonard C. and Mary Lou Hoeft Chair in Engineering at the University of Illinois Urbana–Champaign. He does research in communication networking, auction theory, stochastic analysis, combinatorial optimization, machine learning, information theory, and bioinformatics.

== Background, education, and positions ==
Bruce Hajek attended Willowbrook High School in Villa Park, Illinois. In 1973, he finished sixth place in the USA Mathematical Olympiad. In the same year, he graduated from high school. He entered the University of Illinois Urbana–Champaign (UIUC) to study computer science, but later he switched his major to mathematics. After working in Summer 1975 at Brookhaven National Laboratory with Herbert Robbins, he graduated in 1976 with a BS in mathematics from UIUC and received an NSF Graduate Research Fellowship. He completed his MS degree in electrical engineering in 1977, again from UIUC, and then took his Fellowship to UC Berkeley, where he received his PhD in 1979 under Eugene Wong. The same year, he returned to the department of UIUC in Electrical & Computer Engineering, starting as an assistant professor and then becoming an associate professor (1982) and then a professor (1985). He was named the Leonard C. and Mary Lou Hoeft Chair in Engineering in 2006.

Since 1986, he has been a recurring visitor at Cambridge University. In the 2009–2010 academic year, he was appointed a Rothschild Distinguished Visiting Fellow at the Isaac Newton Institute for Mathematical Sciences at Cambridge.

In 1989, Hajek was elected a IEEE fellow for contributions to stochastic systems, communication networks, and control systems.

== Service and leadership ==
From 1990 to 1993, Hajek served as the editor-in-chief for the IEEE Transactions on Information Theory. In 1995, he served as the president of the IEEE Information Theory Society. He has mentored 18 PhD students, including IBM CEO Arvind Krishna.

== Research ==
=== Random fields ===
Bruce Hajek's PhD dissertation, titled Stochastic Integration, Markov Property and Measure Transformation of Random Fields, studied random fields of three types: continuous-parameter Markov random fields, continuous-parameter random fields admitting stochastic-integral representations, and random fields "arising from transformations of absolutely continuous measures". This work on random fields has been recognized by others.

=== Communication networks ===
Hajek's work has significantly furthered the integration of computers and communications systems. His many papers have taken the chaotic field of communication networking and given it a coherence and conceptual structure that it previously lacked. In the early 1980s, he led research that proved the stability of dynamically controlled ALOHA multiple access. He and his students also developed algorithms for dynamic routing and transmission scheduling. These innovations showed that determinism in service time minimizes waiting time in network queues.

=== Simulated annealing ===
A large fraction of Hajek's citations comes from his work on simulated annealing. His most cited paper, Cooling schedules for optimal annealing, gives a nice condition for convergence of simulated annealing to global minima, depending on the annealing schedule.

== Books ==
- Hajek, Bruce (2015). Random Processes for Engineers. Cambridge University Press. ISBN 978-1-107-10012-1.
- Wong, Eugene; Hajek, Bruce (1985). Stochastic Processes in Engineering Systems (2nd ed.). Springer. ISBN 978-0387960616.

== Awards and honors ==
- 2022 UC Berkeley EE Distinguished Alumni Award "for his prodigious and fundamental research contributions to stochastic processes, information theory, and communications and computer networks; for his sustained and worldwide influence as a beloved teacher and mentor; and for his major leadership role in electrical and computer engineering."
- 2015 SIGMETRICS Achievement Award "for contributions to stochastic analysis, optimization and control, which have provided unique mathematical insights into the performance of the Internet, wireless networks, and peer-to-peer networks such as BitTorrent."
- 2014 Aaron D. Wyner Distinguished Service Award of the IEEE Information Theory Society "for his longstanding contributions as" an [editor-in-chief], an "organizer of many conferences", a "chair of several key society committees and IEEE committees", and a "leader of the information theory society".
- 2006 Markov Lecturer, on network coding and stochastic networks, for the Institute for Operations Research and the Management Sciences Applied Probability Society
- 2003 IEEE Koji Kobayashi Computers and Communications Award, "for the application of stochastic and probabilistic theory to improved understanding of computer-network behavior, particularly, the modeling and performance optimization of multiple-access channels."
- National Academy of Engineering, inducted in 1999 "for contributions to stochastic systems, communication networks, and control."
- 1992 Guggenheim Fellow in Applied Mathematics
- 1991 COMCON Award for Contributions to the Theory of Communications
- IEEE Fellow, inducted in 1989 "for contributions to stochastic systems, communication networks, and control systems."
- 1985 IEEE Control Systems Society Outstanding Paper Award
- 1984 NSF Presidential Young Investigator Award for "stochastic algorithms and analysis for large communication networks."
- 1982 Donald P. Eckman Award for control theory, from the American Automatic Control Council

== See also ==
- Dittert–Hajek conjecture
