= Dittert conjecture =

The Dittert conjecture, or Dittert–Hajek conjecture, is a mathematical hypothesis in combinatorics concerning the maximum achieved by a particular function $\phi$ of matrices with real, nonnegative entries satisfying a summation condition. The conjecture is due to Eric Dittert and (independently) Bruce Hajek.

Let $A = [a_{ij}]$ be a square matrix of order $n$ with nonnegative entries and with $\sum_{i=1}^n \left ( \sum_{j=1}^n a_{ij} \right ) = n$. Its permanent is defined as
$$\operatorname{per}(A)=\sum_{\sigma\in S_n}\prod_{i=1}^n a_{i,\sigma(i)},$$
where the sum extends over all elements $\sigma$ of the symmetric group.

The Dittert conjecture asserts that the function $\operatorname{\phi}(A)$ defined by $\prod_{i=1}^n \left ( \sum_{j=1}^n a_{ij} \right ) + \prod_{j=1}^n \left ( \sum_{i=1}^n a_{ij} \right ) - \operatorname{per}(A)$ is (uniquely) maximized when $A = (1/n) J_n$, where $J_n$ is defined to be the square matrix of order $n$ with all entries equal to 1.

== History and partial results ==
Sinkhorn proved the conjecture for $n=2$ in 1984, and Hwang proved it for $n=3$ in 1987. Hwang also showed that a maximizing matrix with all entries positive must be the uniform matrix. Cheon and Wanless subsequently proved that every maximizing matrix is fully indecomposable and excluded matrices whose zero entries form a single nonempty rectangular block, up to row and column permutations.

A major breakthrough came in 2026 with Zhekai Pang's preprint, which presented a proof for all dimensions $n\geq17$ using refined matrix-scaling estimates. Other dimension-specific advances were also reported that year: Boris Kafidov presented a proof for $n=16$ using a joint-deficit scaling lemma. Jinhui Li, Beibei Xiong, and Zhengfeng Yang presented a proof for $n=4$ using an exact constrained sum-of-squares certificate.

A further 2026 preprint by Xinan Dai, Wenhao Deng, Yingdong Shi, Tailin Wu, and Yuchen Yang proposed a proof for every $n\geq2$ through boundary rigidity. It also presented separate spectral arguments for dimensions 7 through 13 and prescribed-zero arguments for dimensions 14 and 15; the latter use Kafidov's scaling lemma.

Yair Lavi extended the conjecture to the coefficients of homogeneous real stable polynomials with nonnegative coefficients, and presented a proof of the extended inequality. This yields an independent proof of the Dittert conjecture, as well as analogous inequalities for mixed discriminants and subpermanents.
