= Potsdam University Library =

Academic library in Germany

Coordinates: 52°24′27″N 12°58′24″E

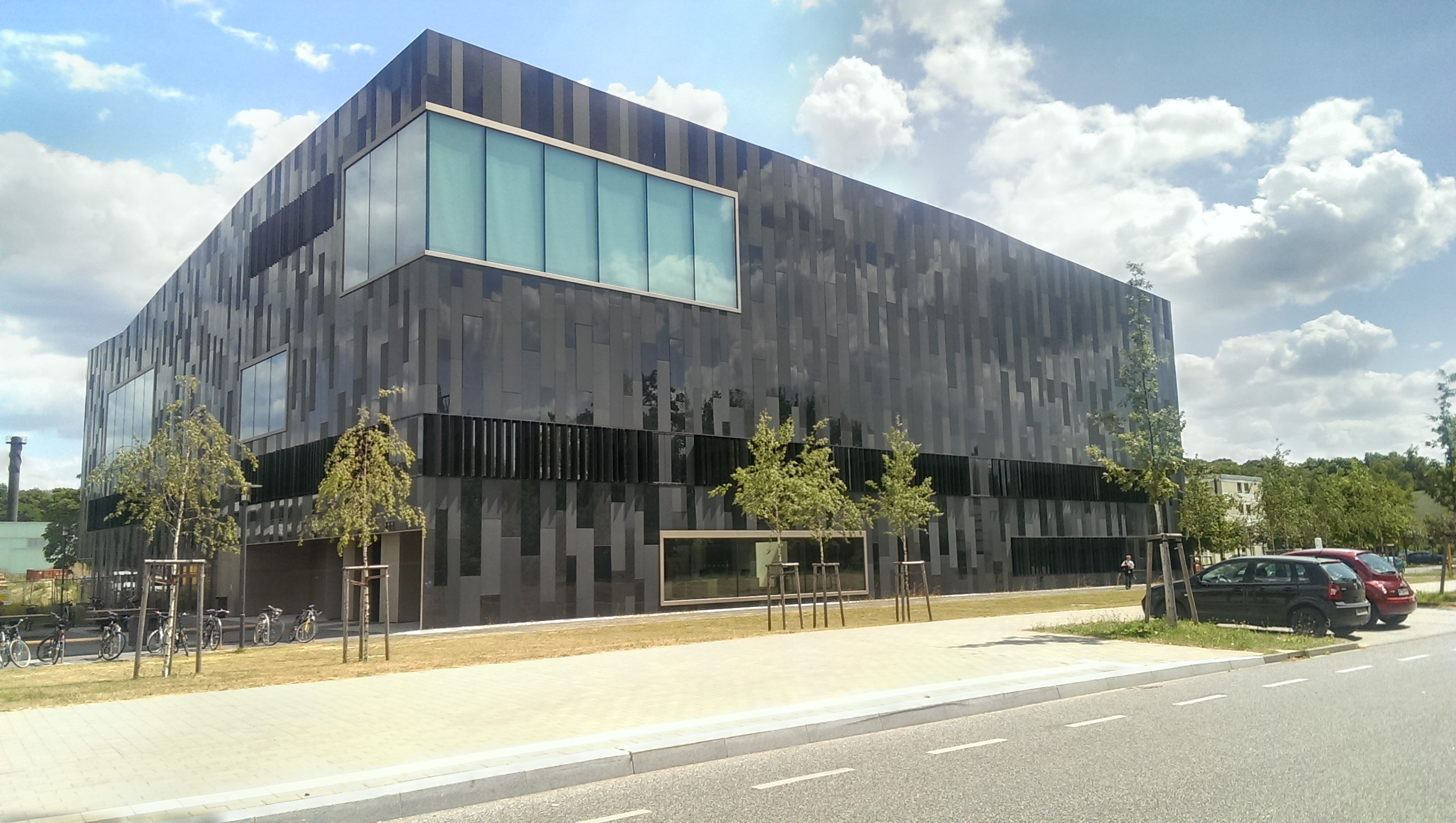
- Information and communication center
- Interactive map of Potsdam University Library
- Affiliation: University of Potsdam
- Collection size: 1.3 million volumes
- Website: www.ub.uni-potsdam.de/en/

The University Library of Potsdam (Universitätsbibliothek Potsdam) is the largest academic library in the German state of Brandenburg. It serves the academic community of the University of Potsdam as well scholars, students and citizens in Berlin and Brandenburg.

== Structure and organization ==
The University Library of Potsdam is a unified library system with three branches, one at each of the three university campuses. The holdings in the fields of the humanities are housed in at the New Palace at Park Sanssouci, a UNESCO World Heritage Site; the holdings in the fields of Law, Economics and Social Sciences are located on the Potsdam-Babelsberg campus; and resources in the fields of Human and Natural Sciences can be found in the library building located on the Golm campus. Both the University Archives and the University Press are part of the University Library. In addition, it is a member of both the Gemeinsamer Bibliotheksverbund (GBV) and Kooperativer Bibliotheksverbund Berlin-Brandenburg (KOBV)

== History ==
The University Library was founded in 1991 as part of the University of Potsdam, which was founded a year after the reunification of Germany. It contains the holdings of previous institutions such as the Karl Liebknecht College of Education and the Academy of Justice and the State of the German Democratic Republic (GDR).

After years of having to repeatedly move the library to different buildings, the library moved into functionally appropriate quarters: in 2000 to a former depot of the German Red Cross in Babelsberg, which was converted into an attractive structure and in 2006 to an extensively refurbished back building (remise) at South Commun, extended by a new glass building at the New Palace. The first real library building of the university, an information and communication center located in the City of Science in Potsdam-Golm, was completed in 2011. It provides readers with 6,800 square meters of usable space, a capacity of 1 million volumes, large reading and multimedia areas, carrels, group study rooms and a special reading room for rare material.

== Holdings ==
Currently, the library's holdings number about 1.3 million volumes, 30,000 e-journals, 390 databases and 1.5 million e-books. The University Library of Potsdam is a library of medium scale by German standards.

In the first years of the university (1991–2002) a core collection could be built based on the Hochschulbauförderungsgesetz, a German law that defined the development of academic institutions as a common mission of the Federal Government and the States. The collections are now being systematically developed. Various disciplines are covered, representing the interdisciplinary focus of the university and the idea of the universitas litterarum, the institutional representation of all of the traditionally relevant disciplines of knowledge. The development plan for universities in Brandenburg until 2025 names as its fields of research excellence and expertise: teacher education, media studies, science, Jewish studies, etc.

About half of the collections of the University Library of Potsdam are open access holdings shelved according to the Regensburg classification system (RVK), which is widely used in Germany. An interlibrary loan system allows registered users to request material held at other sites. There are about 430,000 lending transactions annually and 28,000 registered borrowers. An increase in efficiency is a result of the introduction of RFID (radio frequency identification). The holdings of each library site are equipped with transponders and the users borrow and return items quickly using self-service machines. At present, 740 seats are available for readers in the whole library system, 160 of which have workstations, enabling access to an online catalogue or the Internet.

== Special collections ==
The University Library of Potsdam owns collections of valuable Judaica and Hebraica books:

- the archive of Israel Bercovici (1921–1988), chief dramatic advisor at the Jewish State Theatre of Bucarest and historian of the Yiddish theatre,
- the collection of Professor Yehuda Aschkenasy with the holdings of the Jewish School of Veitel Heine Ephraim in Berlin containing source documents from the most important areas of Hebraic and rabbinic literature (inter alia precious Bible editions) and 58 Hebrew manuscripts from Yemen (17th and 18th century),
- the collection of Dr. Israel Mehlmann including very rare pieces, with accents on the fields of Kabbalah, Chassidism, liturgy and the popular folk tale,
- the music archive of Yiddish songs and klezmer music compiled by David Kohan, a specialist of Yiddish Studies, Chassan (prayer leader) and musicologist, which is available as David Kohan wiki for members of the university on the campus and for external researchers after registration.
- a collection of historical sound recordings of Yiddish songs, klezmer music and Purim plays of the ethnologists Moshe Beregovsky and Sofia Magid from Kyiv and Saint Petersburg.

Part of the collections are also rare books of various subjects from the 17th and 18th centuries. The digitized titles are available online via the Digital Brandenburg platform / Digitales Brandenburg .

In 2009 the University Library of Potsdam began integrating the holdings of the special library of the former Center for European Enlightenment Research (Forschungszentrum Europäische Aufklärung – FEA). The library contains the full text of Neue Bibliothek der schönen Wissenschaften und der freyen Künste, one of the most important German-language journals of the second half of the 18th century, which was digitized by the former FEA with assistance of the DFG, German Research Foundation.

The University Library also manages the holdings of the library of the DGG, (Deutsche Gesellschaft für Geowissenschaften), a deposit collection including a significant collection of geological maps. Part of them are digitized now.

From 1995 till 2019 the University Library of Potsdam was a United Nations Depository Library.

== University Archives ==
The Archives of the Brandenburg State College (Brandenburgische Landeshochschule), whose direct predecessor institution were the Archives of the Karl Liebknecht College of Education created in 1966, became the University Archives in 1991. It contains the holdings of current administrative records as well as documents of permanent value. The archives of the University of Potsdam currently take up about 1,800 running meters. They preserve collections of the following former institutions:

- Brandenburg State College, Potsdam
- Karl Liebknecht College of Education, Potsdam
- Rosa Luxemburg College of Education, Potsdam
- Academy of Justice and the State, Potsdam-Babelsberg.

The University Archives are a public service institution. It is the repository of historically valuable records of the University of Potsdam. The University Archives acquire, organize and promote the use and, as the case may be, the publication of these materials.

== Potsdam University Press ==
The publication service section of the University Library of Potsdam, founded in 1998, enhances both print- and e-publishing and consolidates the responsibilities for the University Press, the UP open archive, the bibliography of publications of the University and the exchange department.

Potsdam University Press stands for the principles of open and permanent access to the scholarly information and ideas and facilitates their wider dissemination according to the resolution of the Senate of the University of 17 May 2006. It has established an editorial platform by publishing peer-reviewed contents. In addition to text documents, multimedia materials (lecture recordings, digital music archives etc.) are now gaining in importance. They are archived on the Multimedia Server of the University of Potsdam administrated by the University Library.

The University Press is member of a Working Group of largely German-language University Presses (Arbeitsgemeinschaft der Universitätsverlage). In 2013 the publishing list of Potsdam University Press contained more than 500 printed books available from the UP Webshop or via Online Bookselling. 80% of the production is filed in the open archive which comprises about 6,000 full text documents of academics and researchers of the university. The bibliography of their publications currently contains about 22,000 titles and registers an annual increase of about 1,200 titles.
