= Oliver Günther =

German academic

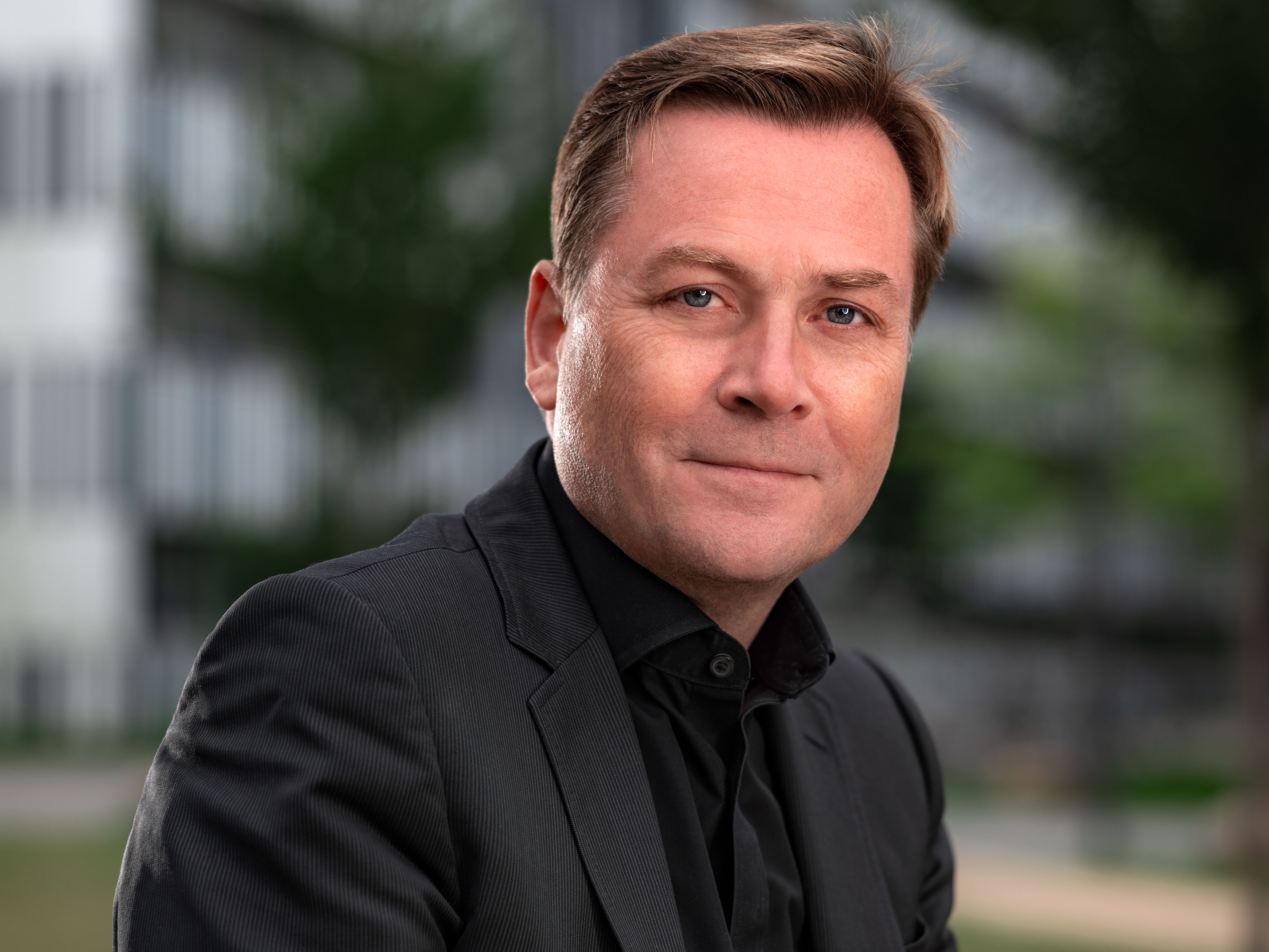
- Günther in 2021
- Born: 22 October 1961 (age 64); Stuttgart
- Occupation: President of the University of Potsdam
- Awards: Doctor of Humane Letters honoris causa, American Jewish University, 2014; Member, Acatech, 2019

Academic background
- Education: Karlsruhe Institute of Technology; University of California, Berkeley
- Thesis: Efficient Structures for Geometric Data Management (1987)
- Doctoral advisor: Eugene Wong

Academic work
- Discipline: Computer Science
- Doctoral students: Hans-Arno Jacobsen; Gerrit Tamm; Sarah Spiekermann

Oliver Günther (born 22 October 1961 in Stuttgart) is president of the University of Potsdam and former president of the German Informatics Society (GI).

== Education ==
He holds a Diploma in Industrial Engineering from the University of Karlsruhe, and M.S. (1985) and Ph.D. degrees (1987) in Computer Science (advisor: Eugene Wong) from the University of California, Berkeley.

== Career ==
Before becoming assistant professor at the University of California, Santa Barbara (UCSB) in 1988, Günther worked as a post-doc at the International Computer Science Institute (ICSI). From 1989 to 1993, he worked at FAW Ulm (Forschungsinstitut für anwendungsorientierte Wissensverarbeitung). From 1993 until 2011 Günther was Professor of Information Systems at Humboldt-Universität zu Berlin. From 2006 until 2011 he also served as Dean of Humboldt's School of Business and Economics. He was elected president of the University of Potsdam effective 2012.

Günther's research includes enterprise information systems, IT strategy, and digital asset management. He has served as an associate editor for academic journals. He has held visiting faculty positions at the European School of Management and Technology, the École Nationale Supérieure des Télécommunications and the Pôle universitaire Léonard-de-Vinci, UCSB, and the University of Cape Town.

Günther has served as a consultant and board member to various government agencies and high-tech companies. He was chairman of the board of Poptel AGand chief technology officer of Teamtoolz, Inc., a San Francisco-based cloud service provider for the marketing and advertising industry. Commissioned by the German Ministry of the Interior, he currently coordinates the foundation of a business process library for the German public administration.

== Honors ==
- 2014 Doctor of Humane Letters honoris causa), American Jewish University, Los Angeles
- 2018 Member, German Academy of Science and Engineering acatech
- 2019 Fellow, German Informatics Society (GI)

== Memberships and honorary offices ==
- German Informatics Society (GI), member (since 1984), president (2012–2014)
- Social Democratic Party of Germany, member (since 1985)
- Moses Mendelssohn Center for European-Jewish Studies (MMZ), chairman of the board of trustees
- Leibniz Centre for Contemporary History (ZZF), member of the board of trustees
- Fraunhofer Institute for Applied Polymer Research (IAP), member of the board of trustees
- Einstein Forum, member of the board of trustees
- Leibniz Institute for Astrophysics (AIP), member of the board of trustees
- UP Transfer, chairman of the supervisory board
- Rotary Club Berlin-Nord, member
- Stiftung Werner-von-Siemens-Ring, deputy chairman of the board of trustees
- Voltaire Prize, chairman of the jury
- Weizenbaum Institute, member of the board of trustees
- Innovation Award Berlin Brandenburg, chairman of the jury
- Business Development Bank of the State of Brandenburg (IBB), member of the advisory council
- Atlantik-Brücke, member
- proBrandenburg e.V., vice chairman of the board
- German University Alliance UA11+ e.V., chairman of the board
- German Society to Promote Research Transfer (GFFT), member of the board
- Potsdam Citizen Foundation, member of the board
- Coalition for Advancing Research Assessment (CoARA), member of the Steering Board

== Selected works ==
- O. Günther: Die diverse Universität: Gefahr für die Demokratie oder Garantin des Gemeinwohls?. Passagen Verlag, Wien 2025. ISBN 978-3-7092-0627-0.
- O. Günther, S. Evdokimov, M. Fischmann: Provable Security for Outsourcing Database Operations. International Journal of Information Security and Privacy, 4(1), 2010.
- O. Günther, B. Fabian: Security Challenges of the EPC Network. Communications of the ACM 52(7), 2009.
- O. Günther, W. Kletti, U. Kubach: RFID in manufacturing. Springer, Berlin 2008. ISBN 978-3-540-76453-3.
- O. Günther, S. Spiekermann: RFID and the Perception of Control: The Consumer’s View. Communications of the ACM 48(9):73-76, 2005.
- O. Günther, B. Berendt, S. Spiekermann: Privacy in E-Commerce: Stated Preferences vs. Actual Behavior. Communications of the ACM 48(4):101-106, 2005.
- O. Günther, V. Gaede: Multidimensional Access Methods. ACM Computing Surveys 30(2), 1998.
- O. Günther: Environmental information systems. Springer, Berlin 1998. ISBN 3-540-60926-1.
