= ESIEA (university) =

French engineering school

Coordinates: 48.814167°N 2.378056°E

École Supérieure d'Informatique, Électronique, Automatique
- Type: Private
- Established: 1958
- Founders: Maurice Lafargue
- Affiliations: CGE, CDEFI, UGEI
- Budget: Non-profint organization "Association Loi 1901"
- President: Michel Théon
- Director: Loïc Roussel
- Students: 2200
- Doctoral students: 8
- Location: Paris, Ivry-sur-Seine, Laval, Dax, Agen, France
- Website: http://en.esiea.fr

The École supérieure d'informatique, électronique, automatique (ESIEA) is a French engineering school. Its five-year general engineering program focuses on the fields of Science and Technology relating to computing, electronics and automation.

== History ==
=== Early years ===
In August, 1957, a team of researchers camped in a tent on the Mont Blanc glacier, Mer de Glace, facing Montenvers, taking ice measurements with electronic equipment, dreamed of creating an engineering school for electronics applications. The following year, in August 1958, Maurice Lafargue, one of the engineers from the glacier officially founded ESEA (Graduate School of Electronics and Automation Applications), a school to train engineers in interfaces and scientific applications, in Paris, rue Antoine-Dubois.

In 1973 the school moved to an old garage on Vesalius street in the 5th arrondissement of Paris, close to Rue Mouffetard and the Latin Quarter. Two years later, in 1975, the school becomes the property of the Association of Alumni and Friends of ESIEA (AAEA-ESIEA), a non-profit (Law 1901).

In 1985, The commission for engineering qualifications (CTI) enabled ESIEA to deliver the ESIEA engineering degree. Growth continued with the opening of a facility in Ivry sur Seine and the permanent extension of their premises.

=== Additional campuses ===
- 1993 ESIEA opens in Laval in cooperation with local and regional authorities in the Mayenne, a new institution: ESIEA West. As Parisian establishment, the establishment of the West delivers the ESIEA ESIEA engineering degree. Enjoying new premises, local development dynamic active, it gradually integrates local tissue and to feed his teaching achievements and experiences of his field implementation.
- 1994: The association is ESIEA. It opened in 1996 in Laval its research center, ESIEA Search.
- 1998: the ESIEA creates ESIEA Institute whose activities both in Paris and Laval will be devoted to the training and professional.
- 2002: INFO IN'TECH, the Institute of Professionals in 3 years and 5 years is launched.
- 2004: Integration of robotics in the first year of training. Opening of Specialized Masters in information security and systems accredited by the Conférence des Grandes Ecoles.
- 2005: Issuance of Diploma Supplement European standards ECTS detailing in French and English organization of the French higher education, pedagogy ESIEA and personal journey of the student.
- 2006: ESIEA partnered with GEM (Grenoble Ecole de Management), allowing ESIEA students to pursue a specialized masters in project management, innovation management and procurement and logistics in parallel with their fifth year.
- 2007: Research ESIEA diversified by creating pole Cryptology and Virology Operational located in Laval and directed by Eric Filiol.
- 2008: ESIEA sign a memorandum of cooperation with the Faculty of Engineering, Prince of Songkla University (PSU) in Thailand to jointly develop research projects and bilateral exchanges of students and teachers between two institutions.
- 2009: ESIEA in partnership with Euridis (establishment forming trades sales in high technology) opened a training center for the learning (CFA-ITE) specializing in IT jobs.
- 2010: The school opens its fifth laboratory "Digital Art and Research" ARNUM (Art et Recherche Numérique) on the establishment of Paris / Ivry.

== Graduate Program ==
This ESIEA graduate system is divided into three blocks:

- The level obtained when the student has validated the first three levels of the post-baccalaureate study (180 ECTS credits).
- Level M obtained in the Colleges of Engineering, therefore ESIEA in two years (120 ECTS credits), simultaneously ESIEA engineering degree and the rank of Master
- D level (for PhD) obtained by partnership ESIEA and graduate schools as UTT in several years after Mr. level

The curriculum ESIEA is organized in three cycles and five levels:

- the transition cycle ( 1st level says 1A)
- the fundamental cycle ( 2nd and 3rd levels, called 2A and 3A)
- the deepening cycle ( 4th and 5th levels, called 4A and 5A)
