= Yannis Ioannidis =

Greek computer scientist

- Γιάννης Ιωαννίδης
- Born: 1959 (age 66–67); Istanbul, Turkey
- Education: National Technical University of Athens; Harvard University; University of California, Berkeley (PhD)
- Awards: Presidential Young Investigator Award (1991); ACM Fellow (2004); IEEE Fellow (2010); Member of the Academia Europaea (2011)
- Scientific career
- Fields: Database theory; Human–computer interaction
- Workplaces: National and Kapodistrian University of Athens; University of Wisconsin–Madison; University of California, Berkeley
- Thesis: Processing Recursion in Database Systems (1986)
- Doctoral advisor: Eugene Wong
- Doctoral students: Renée Miller
- Website: www.madgik.di.uoa.gr/people/faculty/yioannidis

Yannis Ioannidis (Greek: Γιάννης Ιωαννίδης) is a Greek computer scientist who is the current president of the Association for Computing Machinery. He is a professor at the University of Athens as well as an associated faculty at the "Athena" Research and Innovation Center, where he also served as the president and general director for 10 years (2011–2021).
