= ESIGELEC =

Engineering school in Rouen, France

Coordinates: 49.383652°N 1.077485°E

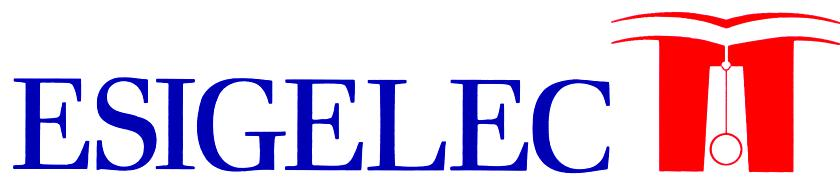
- Motto: Un esprit d'innovation et d'initiative
- Motto in English: A spirit of innovation and initiative
- Type: Grande école
- Established: 1901
- Affiliations: Institut Mines-Télécom (Mines Télécom Institut of Technology); Groupe des écoles des mines; Conférence des Grandes écoles; Union of Independent Grandes Écoles
- Location: Rouen, France
- Campus: Rouen, Technopôle du Madrillet
- Website: esigelec.fr

ESIGELEC is a French engineering school, founded in 1901, and located in Rouen. It is part of the Grandes écoles group of French academic institutions specializing in engineering and sciences and is a university-level institution with the special status Grands établissements. It is under the supervision of the Ministry of Higher Education and Research and jointly managed by the chamber of commerce of Rouen, the Society of Engineers in Electrical Engineering (in French: Société des Ingénieurs en Génie Électrique, SIGELEC), and a consortium of private companies.

== History ==
In 1901, Alexandre Charliat, an engineer from École Centrale Paris, decided to create a school of engineers corresponding to its own perspective on education. He named it the Practical School of Industrial Electricity (École Pratique d'Électricité Industrielle) and established it at 53 rue Belliard in Paris. The school was later renamed the School of Industrial Electricity of Paris (EEIP; École d'Électricité Industrielle de Paris). It was renamed again in 1980, becoming the 'Superior School of Electrical Engineers' (French: École Supérieure d'Ingénieurs en Génie Électrique; ESIGELEC).

The Ministry of Higher Education and Research recognized the school as a Grandes écoles in 1922, and the Commission des Titres d'Ingénieur authorized it to award the Diplôme d'Ingénieur in 1936. In 1989, ESIGELEC became a permanent member of the Grande Ecole conference (Conférence des grandes écoles). In 2011, ESIGELEC became an associate school of the Institut Mines-Télécom (Mines Télécom Institut of Technology) and the Groupe des écoles des mines. The Commission des Titres d'Ingénieur ('Accreditation authority for professional engineers') renewed its authority to grant the Diplôme d'Ingénieur in 2014 for the further duration of six years.

The school has moved many times. The first relocation was in 1968 and saw all components of the school moved to Beauvais. Then, the board of directors believed that the only way to develop the school with its very own educational values was to relocate it far from Paris and the Parisian schools of engineers. They decided to move to Mont-Saint-Aignan, near Rouen, in 1991. In 2004, funding was released to offer the school its own state-of-the-art facilities. The school relocated to the Technopôle du Madrillet, in Saint-Étienne-du-Rouvray, south of Rouen, an area dedicated to innovation with many companies and three academic institutions. The staff and students moved into the new buildings 16 September 2005, the day of the inauguration.

== Status ==
ESIGELEC is a semi-private school. It is under the supervision of the Ministry of Higher Education and Research but is co-led by the chamber of commerce of Rouen. It was created as a nonprofit organization according to the law of 1901. Therefore, students have to make a contribution to the student fee partially paid by private and public funds, and the school cannot be profitable.

== Education ==
=== Degrees ===
==== Prep School ====
ESIGELEC has an integrated Classe préparatoire aux grandes écoles accessible after the Baccalauréat.

==== Engineering cycle ====
ESIGELEC is authorised by the Commission des titres d'ingénieur to award a Diplôme d'Ingénieur, equivalent to a master's degree. As required by the French government, it is awarded after three years of study. Eligible applicants are students who have successfully completed the prep school, a two-year Classe préparatoire aux grandes écoles, or an equivalent university level.

=== Unions ===
Schools of engineers in France are known to promote student life in order to create strong relations between students and allow them to do things they could not do at Classe préparatoire aux grandes écoles, the two years of intense study preceding the entry in the engineering cycle.

ESIGELEC strengthens this reputation by investing money in student unions. The student bureau or student union office (in French: Bureau Des Elèves, lit. 'office of students', BDE) is elected every year in May by the students. It consists of second year students of the engineering cycle gathering in lists and campaigning to obtain the management of the union office. The campaign lasts one week and involves an important organisation.

The student bureau is in charge of organizing the integration week (a program to welcome the incoming students) and financing the other unions of the school.

The unions of the school are:

- La Tortue Déchainée: The newspaper of ESIGELEC.
- ESIG’AERO: The union for those who love planes and parachuting.
- Gala ESIGELEC
- Defi 24h
- 4L Trophy
- Club Zik

== Research ==
ESIGELEC is one of the few French schools to have its own research center. In 2001 the Research Institute for Embedded Electronic Systems (Institut de Recherche en Systèmes Electroniques Embarqués, IRSEEM) was created, a research laboratory specialising in embedded systems. In 2010, the foundation stone of the advanced research facility was laid, creating the Embedded Systems Integration Campus (Campus d'Intégration des Systèmes Embarqués, CISE). It was inaugurated in 2012. This center, dedicated to electrical systems and mechatronics, reinforces the range of research and teaching capabilities of both ESIGELEC and IRSEEM.

== International ==
=== Partnerships ===
ESIGELEC has many international partners around the world with agreements of double-degrees and exchange programs.

==== United States ====
- Lehigh University
- Swanson School of Engineering at the University of Pittsburgh

==== United Kingdom ====
- Cranfield University

==== Russia ====
- Saint Petersburg State University of Aerospace Instrumentation

==== India ====
- Manipal Academy of Higher Education (MAHE), formerly known as Manipal University, Manipal, Karnataka
- Manipal Institute of Technology and Science
- Parul University

Australia

- University of Technology Sydney
- RMIT University Melbourne City Campus
- Murdoch University

== Ranks ==
In 2014 it was ranked in the top 50 French engineering schools by the French business weekly L'Usine nouvelle.
