= Renée Miller =

American computer scientist

Renée J. Miller
- Citizenship: United States
- Education: University of Wisconsin in Madison
- Awards: Fellow of the Royal Society of Canada, Fellow of the Association for Computing Machinery, Presidential Early Career Award for Scientists and Engineers
- Scientific career
- Fields: Computer science
- Workplaces: Northeastern University University of Toronto
- Doctoral advisor: Yannis Ioannidis

Renée J. Miller FRSC is university distinguished professor at Northeastern University, a former professor of computer science at University of Toronto, Canada, and a Fellow of the Royal Society of Canada.

== Background ==
Miller received BS degrees in mathematics and in cognitive science from the Massachusetts Institute of Technology. She received her MS and PhD degrees in computer science from the University of Wisconsin in Madison, United States. Miller is the president of the VLDB Endowment, and the program chair for ACM SIGMOD 2011 in Athens, Greece.

Miller's research interests are in the efficient, effective use of large volumes of complex, heterogeneous data. This interest spans data integration, data exchange, knowledge curation and data sharing.

== Awards and honors ==
Miller received the Presidential Early Career Award for Scientists and Engineers (PECASE), the highest honor bestowed by the United States government on outstanding scientists and engineers beginning their careers. She received the National Science Foundation Early Career Award (formerly, the Presidential Young Investigator Award) for her work on Data Integration. Miller was elected as a Fellow of the Association for Computing Machinery (ACM) in 2010, and a Fellow of the Royal Society of Canada in 2011.

In 2023, Miller was elected as a Fellow of the American Association for the Advancement of Science.
