= Girolamo Simoncelli (1817–1852) =

Italian politician and military leader

Girolamo Simoncelli (16 February 1817 – 2 October 1852) was an Italian political and military leader of the Risorgimento era.

== Biography ==
He was born in Senigallia, province of Ancona. He began his life as a businessman, but by 1845 he had been under scrutiny by the Papal authorities for his political ties and activities. He joined the forces from the papal state that battled against the Austrians in Vicenza in 1848. He returned to his native province, and was elected in 1849 as consigliere comunale to the Roman Republic. He was named commander of the local civil guards, who had to confront some of crime and conspiracies spiking during the turbulent times. With the fall of the Republic, he was arrested, sentenced to execution, and jailed in Pesaro until 1852, when he was executed along with dozens of other men.

His execution was condemned by many in Europe.

== Bibliography ==
- (in Italian) A. Bonopera, Sinigaglia nel 1848-49 e il processo di Girolamo Simoncelli, Jesi, La Tipografica Jesina, 1912.
- (in Italian) G. Monti Guarnieri, Annali di Senigallia, Ancona, Tip. S.I.T.A., 1961.
- (in Italian) A. Mencucci, Pio IX e il Risorgimento, Senigallia, Tip. Adriatica, 1964.
- (in Italian) E. Grossi, Cattolici nel Senigalliese (1897-1920), Senigallia, Edizioni 2G, 1978.
- (in Italian) M. Bonvini Mazzanti, Senigallia, Senigallia, Edizioni 2G, 1981.
- (in Italian) R. P. Uguccioni, L'anno del proverbio. Il 1848 nello Stato pontificio e nella legazione apostolica di Urbino e Pesaro, Pesaro, Flaminia, 1987.
- (in Italian) A. Polverari, Senigallia nella Storia, 4 Evo Contemporaneo Parte Prima, Ostra Vetere, Tecnostampa, 1991.
- (in Italian) M. Severini, Girolamo Simoncelli. La storia e la memoria, Ancona, Risorgimento-affinità elettive, 2008.
