= Andrew Simoncelli =

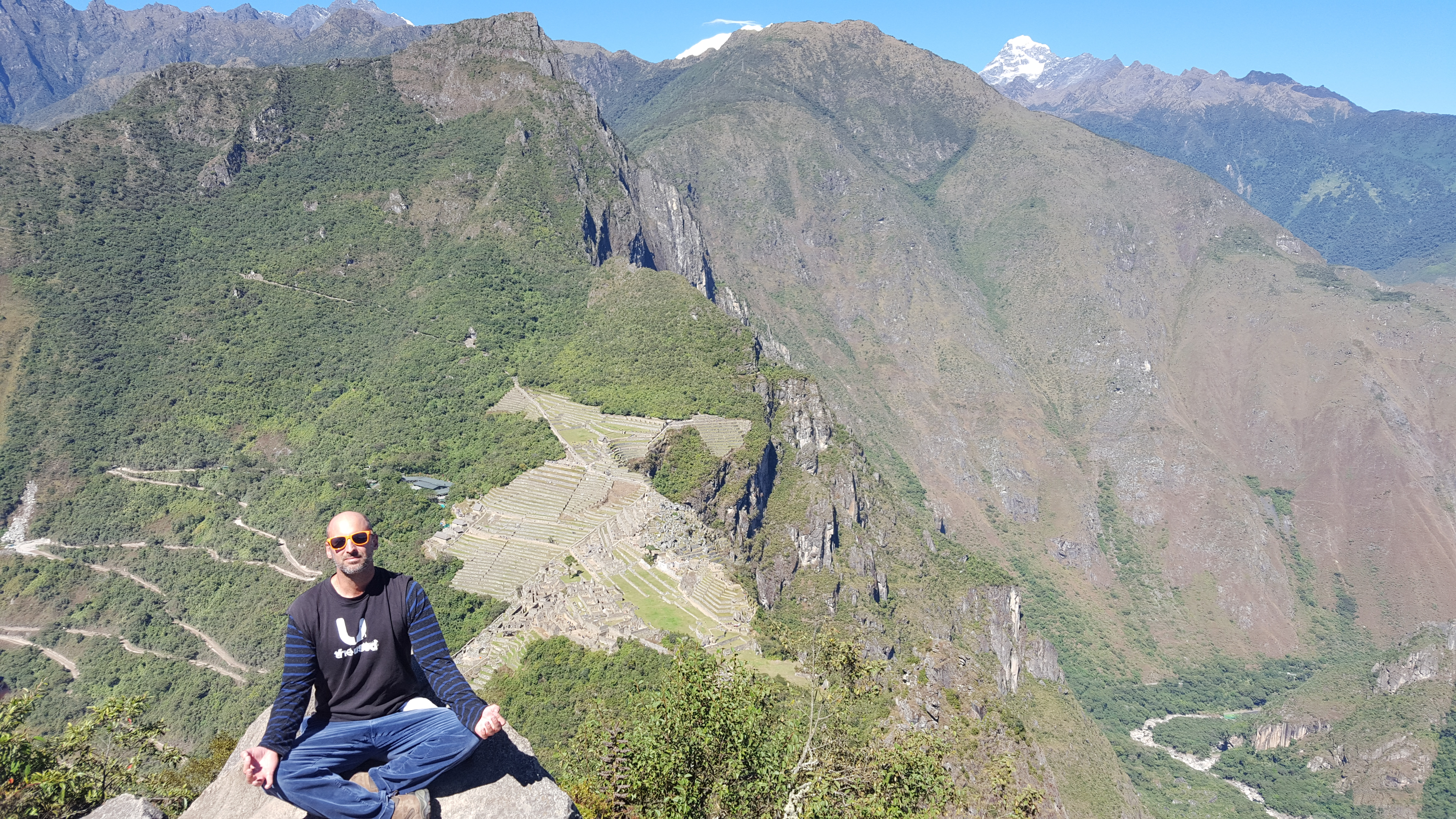
- Simoncelli above Machu Picchu, June 2016
- Born: New York City, New York
- Occupation: Associate professor

Andrew Simoncelli is an associate professor of Mass communication at Nicholls State University in Thibodaux, Louisiana. He started with the school in 1999 when it began its distance education office. Under his leadership, distance learning grew at Nicholls State from offering correspondence courses to multiple online courses and degrees. Nicholls Online has been named to multiple rankings lists for either the best or affordable online programs in the country. In 2020 Simoncelli was awarded the Academic Affairs Award for Teaching Excellence at Nicholls State University for his work with faculty during the COVID-19 pandemic.

Simoncelli formerly worked as a producer for WWL-TV channel 4 in New Orleans, Louisiana.

He received his PhD from Louisiana State University in 2005. His dissertation was titled "Designing Online Instruction for Postsecondary Students with Learning Disabilities." Subsequent articles were published in various journals.

In March 2024, Simoncelli and Nicholls History Professor Paul Wilson presented at the 17th International Conference on e-Learning and Innovative Pedagogies in Valencia, Spain. The title of their paper was Using Artificial Intelligence to Promote Media Literacy in Higher Education.

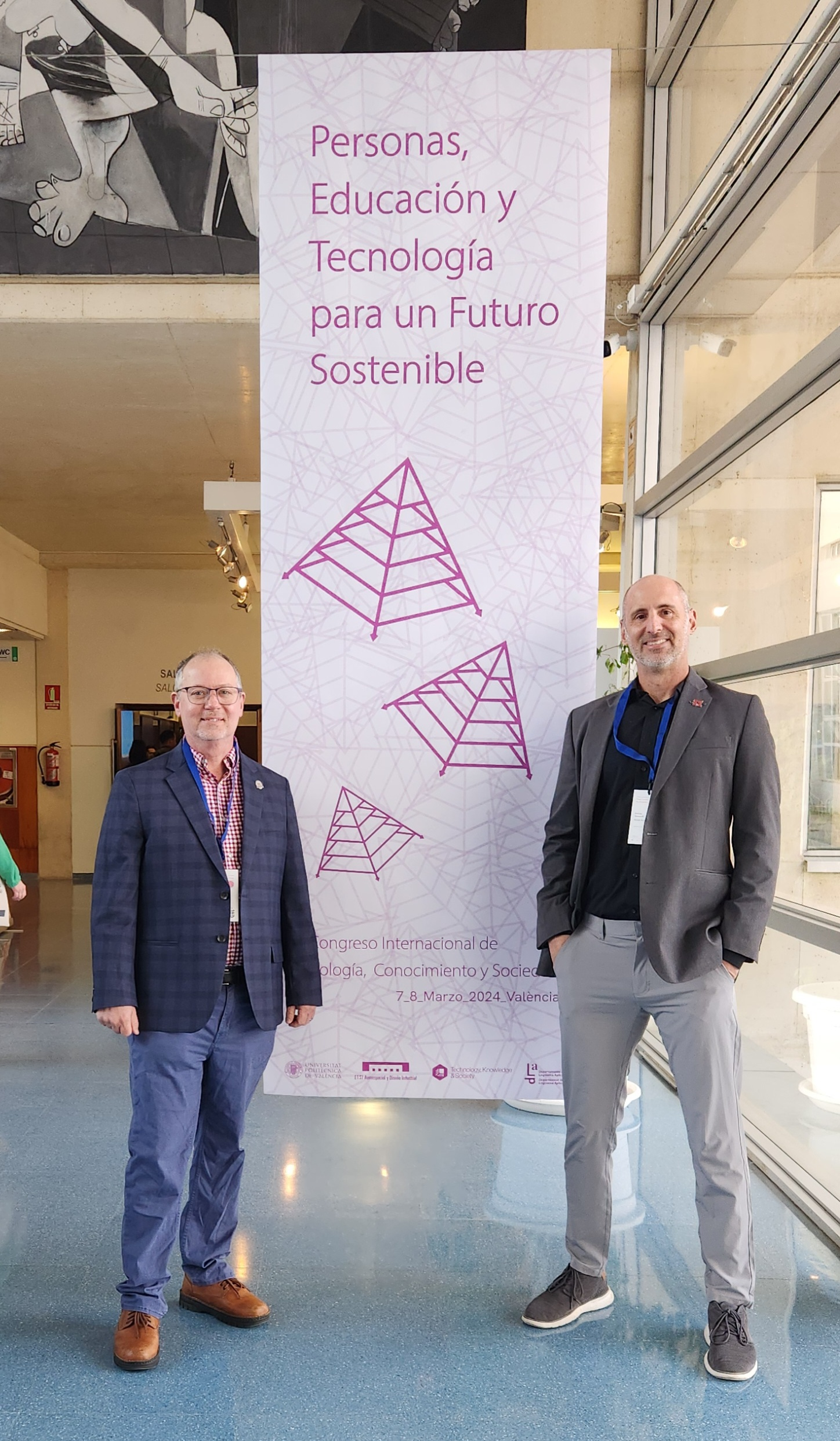
Simoncelli and Wilson in Spain

== Roving Professor ==
Simoncelli has also become known as "Roving Professor" for his many travels as a teacher, learner, and vacationer. He taught at Pôle universitaire Léonard-de-Vinci in Paris, France in 2011 and 2013 for the school's International Week programming. In 2020 Simoncelli was selected again to teach at Pole University for his topic “Digital Transformation in Higher Education and other Traditional Business Models”. In 2009 he has also studied in Italy as part of the Rotary Club's Group Exchange Program. Simoncelli and others spent a month in the Lombardy region of Italy learning about their professions. Simoncelli also maintains a Facebook, Twitter, and YouTube pages under the Roving Professor nom de plume. In 2018, Simoncelli was in Paris when France won the World Cup. His trip was featured in a local paper about residents experiencing the World Cup. In March 2022, Dr. Simoncelli once again taught in Paris at Pôle Universitaire Léonard De Vinci as part of their International Week. He was joined there by professors from around the world to be guest lecturers to the students at the university. The topic of Simoncelli's lectures was Digital Transformation in Higher Education and other Traditional Business Models.
