= The Limoges Computer Sciences Engineering School =

French engineering school

Coordinates: 45.8188°N 1.2711°E

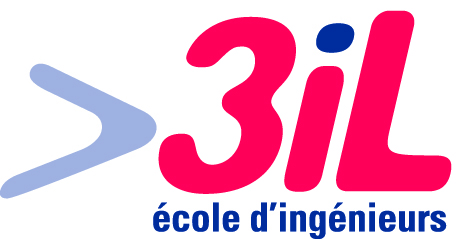

Informations
- Established: 1987
- Type: Computer Sciences Engineering School

Location
- City: Limoges
- Country: France
- Region: Limousin

Direction
- President: Ali Mankar-Bennis

Key Figures
- Academic Staff: 80
- Students: 450
- Graduated/year: 139 in 2009

More
- Affiliation: CDEFI, Commission des titres d'ingénieur, EUR-ACE label Université de Limoges
- Site web: http://www.3il-ingenieurs.fr
- modifier

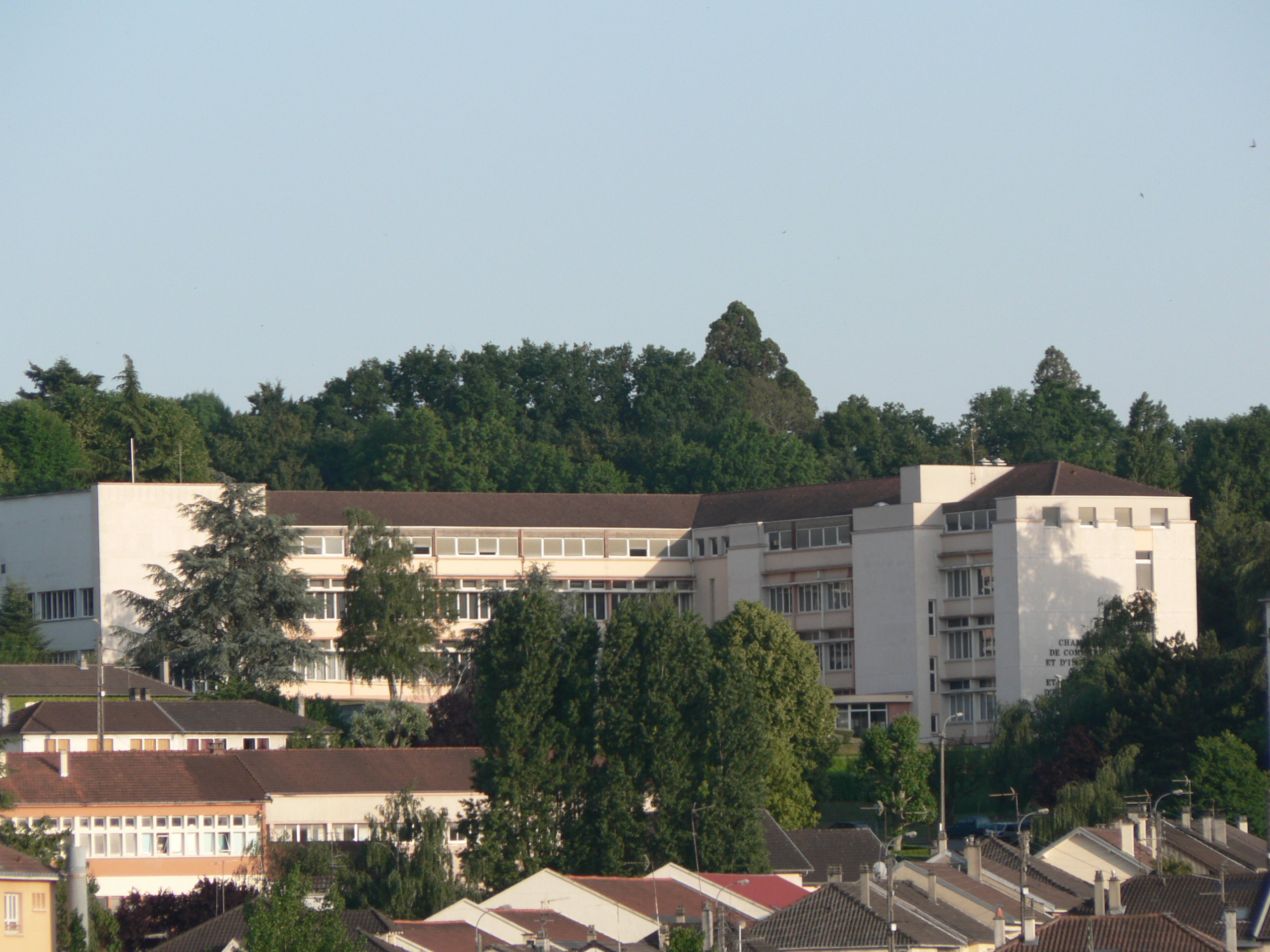
The Limoges Computer Sciences Engineering School (3iL)

3iL is the Limoges Computer Sciences Engineering School and one of the 210 French engineering schools authorized to issue an engineering diploma.

3iL is empowered by the French CTI (Commission des Titres d’Ingénieur - Engineering Degree Commission) to issue the title of engineering, Master grade, in computing, under student status and apprenticeship, at Limoges and Rodez, in partnership with the CFA Sup of the Limousin region and the ITII Midi-Pyrenees. This authorization was renewed in 2014 and was accompanied by the EUR-ACE label.

== Background ==
1987 : 3iL is an engineering school created by the Chamber of Commerce and Industry of Limoges. It is attached to the University of Limoges. 1st class was composed of 18 students.

1995: First 3iL partnership with Rodez CCI.

1998: Renewal of the authorization of 3iL for 6 years.

1999: 3iL authorization to award the title of engineer through apprenticeship.

2000: Partnership between 3iL and the High Technological School (High Tech) in Morocco.

2002: Creation of the apprenticeship section in Rodez.

2003: International opening: partnership with China (Shanghai University), Burkina Faso (Ouagadougou and Bobo Dioulasso), and Greece (University of Athens).

2004: Development of the technological platform.

2005: Renewal of the CTI authorization; signing of 15 international conventions for student and teacher exchange.

2006: Signature of more than 20 new international conventions.

2007: An opportunity sponsored by the EDS, the second service company in the world.

2008: Signing of a research agreement with the XLIM laboratory, development of computer science preparatory classes 3iL.

2009: Opening of a preparatory class in China.

2010: Renewal of the CTI authorization for 3 years, signing of an agreement with the University of Limoges.

2014: Renewal of the CTI authorization for 3 years.

== Training ==
=== Admission ===
Recruitment is done through writing contests (e3a contests, DUT-BTS bank, PT Bank, CCP, competitions or contests ALPHA) and interviews.

=== Integrated Preparatory Cycle ===
Within 2 years, it prepares, the entry into the engineering cycle in the form of two different diploma profiles:

- Science-oriented profile: Preparatory cycle with Maths / Info (Third year of Bachelor obtained from the Limoges Faculty of Science) being the specialty;
- Technology-related profile: preparatory course with IT Services to organizations (BTS obtained from the Limoges Beaupeyrat High School) being the specialty.

Technological Preparatory Cycle focuses on the program of the BTS IT Service for Organizations. Additional courses in Engineering Sciences are taught by the 3iL in order to complete this training.

The Scientific preparatory cycle provides teaching about the third year of Bachelor Maths / Informatics of the Limoges Faculty of Science as well as additional result in informatics and English.

=== Engineering cycle ===
Having a duration of three years, it is composed of:

- One semester of knowledge harmonization
- Three semesters focused on common core
- One semester of personalized deepening
- A semester dedicated to the final stage of studies

The engineering training can be customized in several ways:

- By achieving a double degree in the final year of engineering studies : ISICG Master (Master in Computer Image Synthesis and Computer Graphics) or Cryptis Master (Master in Information Security and Cryptology, computer security course) from the Limoges Faculty of Science and Technology
- By selecting an international mobility
- During the third year, the student has to choose between the following specialization courses: Web Development, IT Security, development and innovation, Artificial Intelligence and Robotics, Web marketing, Embedded Systems, Advanced Networks

The engineer cycle of education is based on three main pillars:

- Engineering sciences (mathematics, physics, electronics, etc.)
- Human and social sciences (law, management, meeting management, personal commitment, etc.)
- Computer and Emerging Technologies (network, web development, software engineering, databases, computer security, etc.)

The completion of 40 weeks of work experience is mandatory, concentrated mainly in Grades 3 and 4 (2 months each year) and Grade 5 (6 months). Students are directly involved in the implementation of concrete projects and are able to compare the theoretical and practical realities in the terrain.

== Companies ==
Each 3iL promotion is sponsored by a big company; 2015 Emakina promotion, promotion Legrand for 2016 and the one for 2017 promoted by Cap Gemini. 2018 will be by Accenture’s promotion.

A student consulting office, the 3iL Expertise, having a direct contact with the professional world, is also present and allows to renew contracts as well as to obtain more experience on concrete projects.

== Research ==
The research is conducted in partnership with the XLIM laboratory of the University of Limoges. The 3iL is involved in three departments of the XLIM Institute of Research:

- DMI: Department of Mathematics and Computer Science
- MINACOM: Micro and nanotechnologies for optoelectronic and microwave components
- OSA: Waves and associated systems

== International ==
3iL has dual activity dedicated to international relations.

One concerns the incoming mobility: The 3iL receives international students (over 20 nationalities are represented, students from partner schools, participants in European exchange programs, etc.) to advance intercultural diversity.

The other is related to outgoing mobility: The international mobility of at least three months is required for graduation. This mobility may take the form of a summer language school, one semester of studying abroad, a work placement or other job, a double degree.

== Partnership ==
The school is an official academic partner of Microsoft, Cisco and Oracle. It has also a partnership with the IT and management companies in France and abroad.
