= Leonardo da Vinci Engineering School =

French engineering school

Coordinates: 48°53′46″N 2°14′09″E

Leonard de Vinci Engineering School
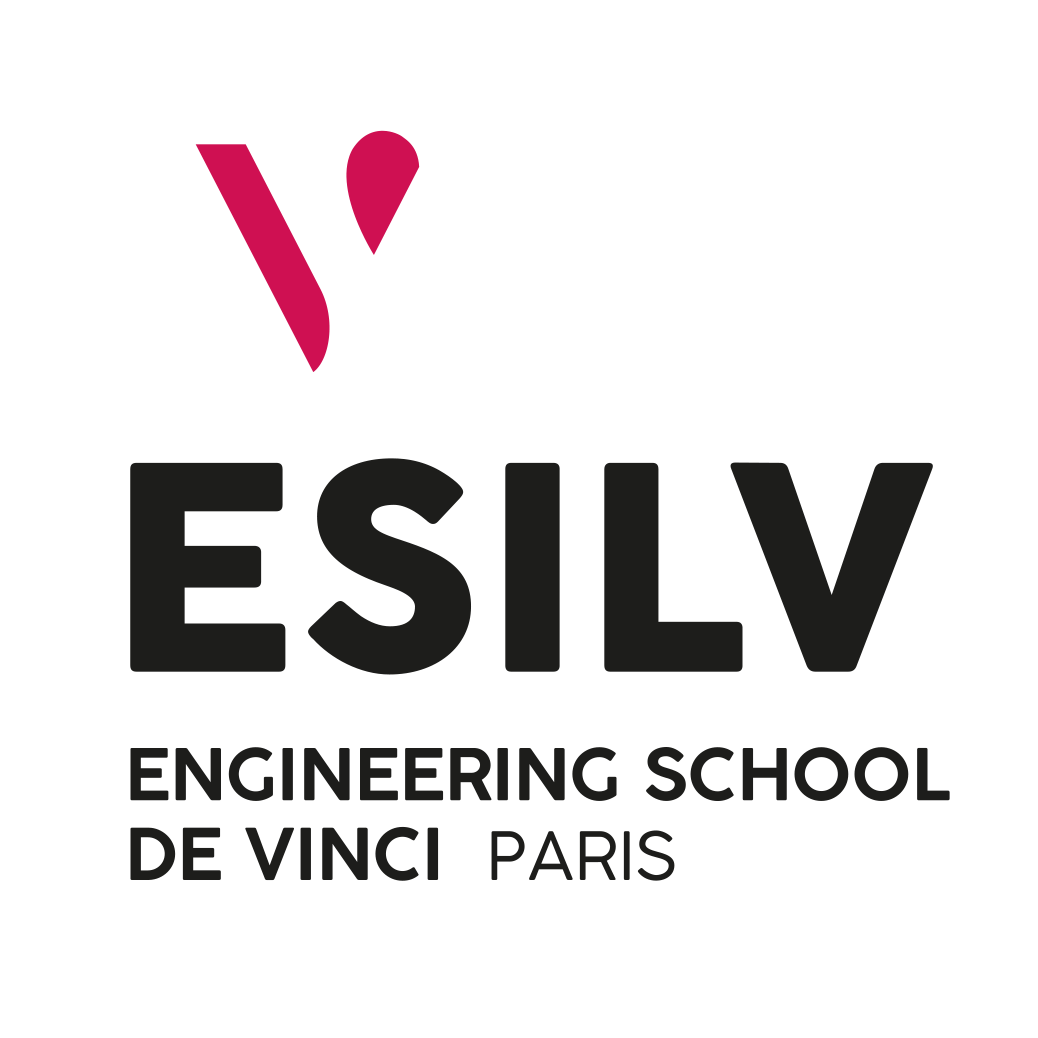
- Type: Engineering School
- Established: 1994
- Founder: Charles Pasqua
- Budget: 21 000 000 € (2018)
- Director: Pascal Pinot
- Location: Paris La Défense, France
- Website: http://www.esilv.fr/en

The Leonard de Vinci Engineering School (ESILV) is an engineering school located in Paris, France. It is fully accredited to award the title of ingénieur by the French Commission of Engineering Titles. ESILV is part of the "Pôle universitaire Léonard-de-Vinci". The director of the school is Pascal Pinot.

It was placed 10th among French engineering schools "Post-bac" in the 2010 Le Point rankings.

Since 2022, the school has been the highest-ranked private school post-high school according to Usine Nouvelle, L'Étudiant, and Le Figaro. In 2024, ESILV was ranked 2nd by L'Étudiant, 3rd by Le Figaro in post-baccalaureate rankings, and 1st by Usine Nouvelle in the same category. Furthermore, in 2023, it was ranked 3rd in the general ranking of French engineering schools by Usine Nouvelle, where it was also ranked first in the following categories: aerospace, automotive and transport, mechanical engineering, as well as computer science, electronics, and telecommunications.

== History ==
The Leonard de Vinci Engineering School (ESILV) was created in 1995 by the Conseil général des Hauts-de-Seine. It is an engineering school which is located in La Défense. Since 2003, the diploma of ESILV is a recognized diploma by the Commission des Titres d'Ingénieur (CTI). This accreditation has been renewed in 2013.

== Departments ==
The ESILV is composed of four departments:

- Financial engineering
- New energies
- Computer science
- Computational mechanics

The majors offered apply in the area of modeling and numerical simulation, computer networks and databases, new energies, new information technologies, computational mechanics, and financial engineering.

== Admission ==
Students enter after high school graduation (e.g. French Baccalauréat). Application is made during the senior year. Students may also enter after the Classe Préparatoire aux Grandes Écoles and spend three years in the school or after a Licence and spend two years in the school.

== Studies ==
There are a wide variety of classes taught at the Engineering School Leonard de Vinci: mathematics, scientific computation, computer science, mechanical engineering, and financial engineering to name a few. In addition, students take classes at the partnering management school EMLV in areas such as marketing and management. For further real-world experience, their curriculum includes two six-month internships with industrial partners.

Since the graduation of the first senior class in July 2000, all of the alumni of the ESILV have successfully joined the work force and were hired as:

- Computational Engineer
- Design Engineer
- Development Engineer
- Testing Engineer
- Software Engineer
- Production Engineer
- Research Engineer
- Computer Network Engineer
- Trader Engineer
- Risk Management Engineer
- Security and Exchange Manager
- Quantitative Finance Analyst

== Administration ==
- Director: Pascal Pinot
- Director of studies: Remy Sart
- Head of the Department of New Energies: Frédéric Fauberteau
- Head of the Department of Computer Science: Gaël Chareyron
- Head of the Department of Financial Engineering: Cyril Grunspan
- Head of the Department of Computational Mechanics: Radoin Belaouar
