= Business & Information Systems Engineering =

- Discipline: Information systems, business systems
- Language: English
- Edited by: Christof Weinhardt

Publication details
- Former name: Wirtschaftsinformatik
- History: 2009–present
- Publisher: Gabler Verlag
- Frequency: Bimonthly
- Impact factor: 7.4 (2023)

Standard abbreviations
- ISO 4: Bus. Inf. Syst. Eng.

Indexing
- ISSN: 2363-7005 (print); 1867-0202 (web)

Links
- Journal homepage

Business & Information Systems Engineering is a bimonthly peer-reviewed academic journal covering research on the design and utilization of information systems.

== History ==
The journal is the English language successor of wirtschaftsinformatik, which was the flagship journal of the German-language information systems community for more than 50 years. The German journal Elektronische Datenverarbeitung, published since 1959, was renamed Angewandte Informatik in 1971 and again in Wirtschaftsinformatik in 1989, with the first issue published in 1990. To expand its reach in Europe and internationally, and to better reach its international scientific community, Wirtschaftsinformatik was published in a cover-to-cover English translation under the title Business & Information Systems Engineering since issue 1/2009. The strategic decision to better address the international community led to the termination of the German version with issue 6/2014; from issue 1/2015 onwards only the English journal remains.

== Editors-in-chief ==
The following persons are or have been editor-in-chief:

- Oliver Hinz: since 2023
- Christof Weinhardt: 2019–2023
- Martin Bichler: 2012–2019
- Hans Ulrich Buhl: 2006–2013
- Wolfgang König: 1998–2008
- Ulrich Hasenkamp: 1992–2000
- Peter Mertens: 1990–2000
- Norbert Szyperski: 1971–1991
- Paul Schmitz: 1969–1991
- Hans Konrad Schuff: 1959–1968

== Affiliations ==
The journal is sponsored by the section "Information Systems" (Wirtschaftsinformatik) of the German Association for Business Research and the special interest group "Business Informatics" of the Gesellschaft für Informatik with more than 1200 members. It is also an affiliated journal of the Association for Information Systems.
