= Ecole de Management Léonard De Vinci =

Business school in Paris, France

Coordinates: 48°53′46″N 2°14′10″E

- Ecole de Management Léonard De Vinci
- Motto: Dépassez vos frontières
- Type: Grande école de commerce et de management (Private research university Business school)
- Established: 1995; 31 years ago
- Accreditation: EFMD; AMBA; AACSB
- Academic affiliations: Conférence des grandes écoles;
- President: Sébastien Tran
- Students: 3,000 students
- Location: Paris La Défense
- Language: English & French
- Colors: blanc et bleu
- Website: www.emlv.fr

EMLV (Ecole de Management Léonard De Vinci) – the Leonard de Vinci Business School Paris-La Defense – is a business school in Paris located at the Pôle universitaire Léonard-de-Vinci in La Defense, the main business district of Paris. It delivers a 5-year program and is accredited by the French government and recognized at the European level by ENQA. The Pôle Universitaire Léonard De Vinci campus also includes a school of engineering (ESILV) and an international school of multimedia (IIM).

== Programmes ==
=== Master in Management ===
The MiM (Grande Ecole Programme) is EFMD-Master accredited and geared towards fresh graduates and young professionals wishing to enhance their career in business.

=== MBA ===
EMLV MBA is an intensive 1-year programme distinguished by AMBA accreditation, the highest standard of achievement in higher education earned only by the most prestigious programmes at worldwide level.

=== MSc Supply Chain Management ===
The MSc Supply Chain Management is a 1-year programme and aims to develop advanced technical skills and places value on the Corporate Social Responsibility (CSR) principals and latest engineering industrial trends taught at ESILV.

=== MSc Digital Business Analytics ===
The MSc Digital Business Analytics explores the various applications of data in our daily life. Societies and economies across the world require specialists in the use of digital analytics to improve the states of businesses.

=== MSc International Business ===
The MSc International Business educates students in best business practices in an international business environment.

=== MSc International Finance & Asset Management ===
The MSc International Finance & Asset Management will provide students with practical expertise in key domains of finance, a fast-paced environment in constant evolution.

== Leadership ==
Pascal Brouaye is the director of the university. The director of the Management School is Sebastien Tran.

The founder is Charles Pasqua, who organized the university in 1995.

== International orientation and partner universities ==
The EMLV program places an emphasis on student exposure to real case studies with businesses by providing consulting services to the school's business partners. With more than 100 international partners welcoming its students in exchange programs, students are also encouraged to study abroad to enhance their cross-cultural understanding and linguistic skills.

=== Selected partner universities ===
- University of Málaga
- Vilnius University
- MCI Management Center Innsbruck
- University of Genoa
- London South Bank University
- Coventry University
- Long Island University
- State University of New York at Old Westbury
- University of Quebec (UQAC)
- British Columbia Institute of Technology, Vancouver
- Beijing Jiaotong University

== Placement ==
The graduates of EMLV work in all the major sectors, including:

- Auditing and consulting (20%)
- Finance, insurance, and financial management (25%)
- Luxury goods (8%)
- Press, media, and communication – including new media (23%)
- International business, export, and sales (24%)

== 2018 murder of Professor Dowling ==
Professor John Dowling was stabbed after class 13 times by a former management student for "insulting Islam". The suspect had enrolled in the Management School in 2016. Frédérique Vidal, France's Minister of Higher Education, declared "indignation" because of the killing.
