= University of Potsdam =

University in the German city of Potsdam

- Universität Potsdam
- Type: Public
- Established: 1991
- Academic affiliations: TPC
- Budget: € 261.1 million
- President: Oliver Günther
- Academic staff: 1,874
- Administrative staff: 1,121
- Students: 19,691 (2024–25)
- Location: Potsdam, Brandenburg, Germany; 52°24′04″N 13°00′43″E
- Campus: Multiple sites
- Website: uni-potsdam.de

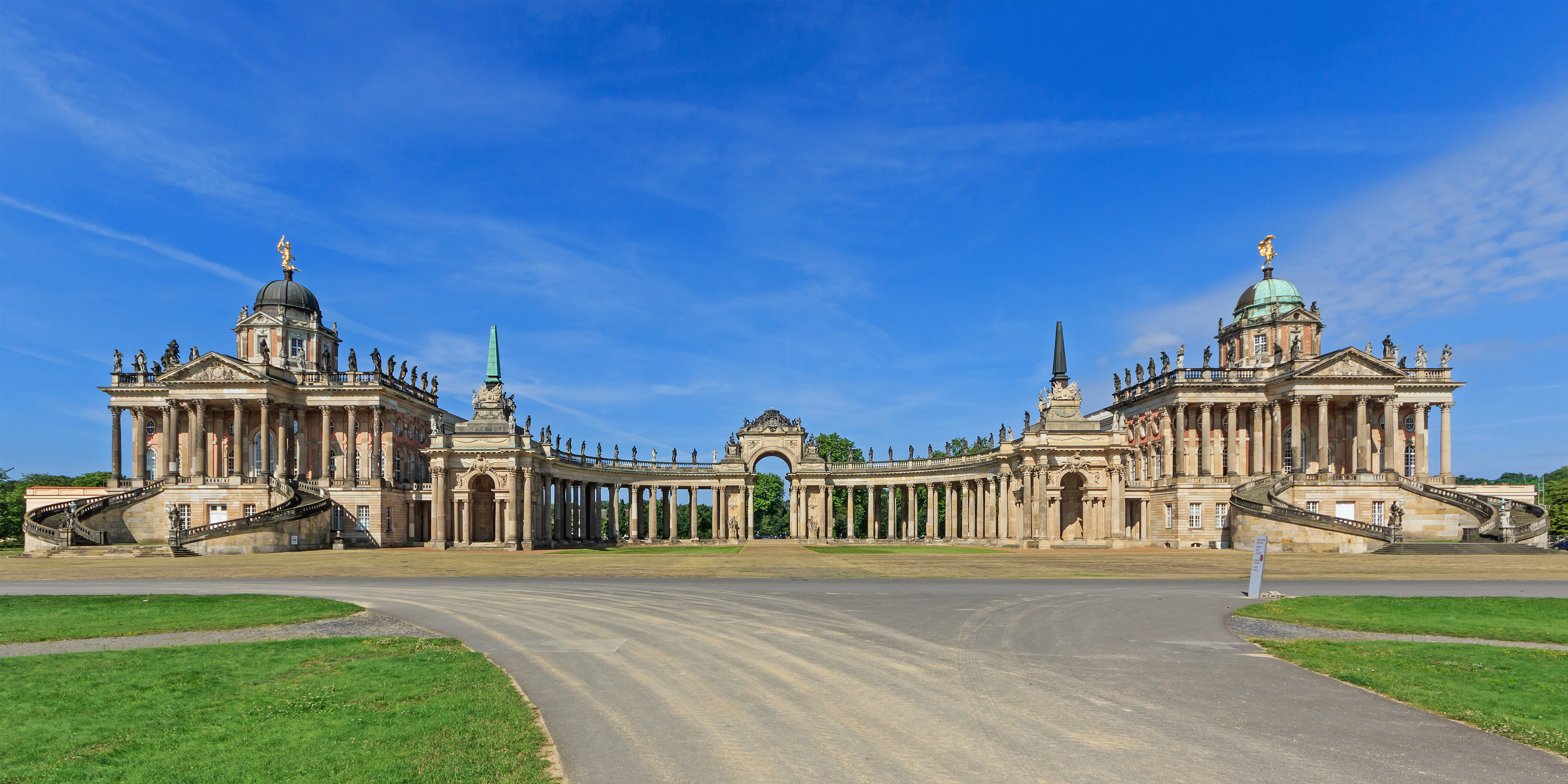
Part of the University of Potsdam campus: the Commons building at the New Palace.

The University of Potsdam is a public university in Potsdam, capital of the state of Brandenburg, northeastern Germany.

The university is mainly situated across three campuses in the city. Some faculty buildings are part of the New Palace of Sanssouci which is known for its UNESCO World Heritage status.

The University of Potsdam is Brandenburg's largest university and the fourth largest in the Berlin-Brandenburg metropolitan area. More than 8,000 people are working in scholarship and science.

In 2009 the University of Potsdam became a winner in the "Excellence in Teaching" initiative of the Stifterverband für die Deutsche Wissenschaft (Business innovation agency for the German science system).

== History ==
The University of Potsdam was formed in 1991 by the amalgamation of the Karl Liebknecht College of Education and the Brandenburg State College, as well as several other smaller institutions. As the university in large part emerged from the College of Education, emphasis today is still placed on teacher training.

=== Historical buildings ===
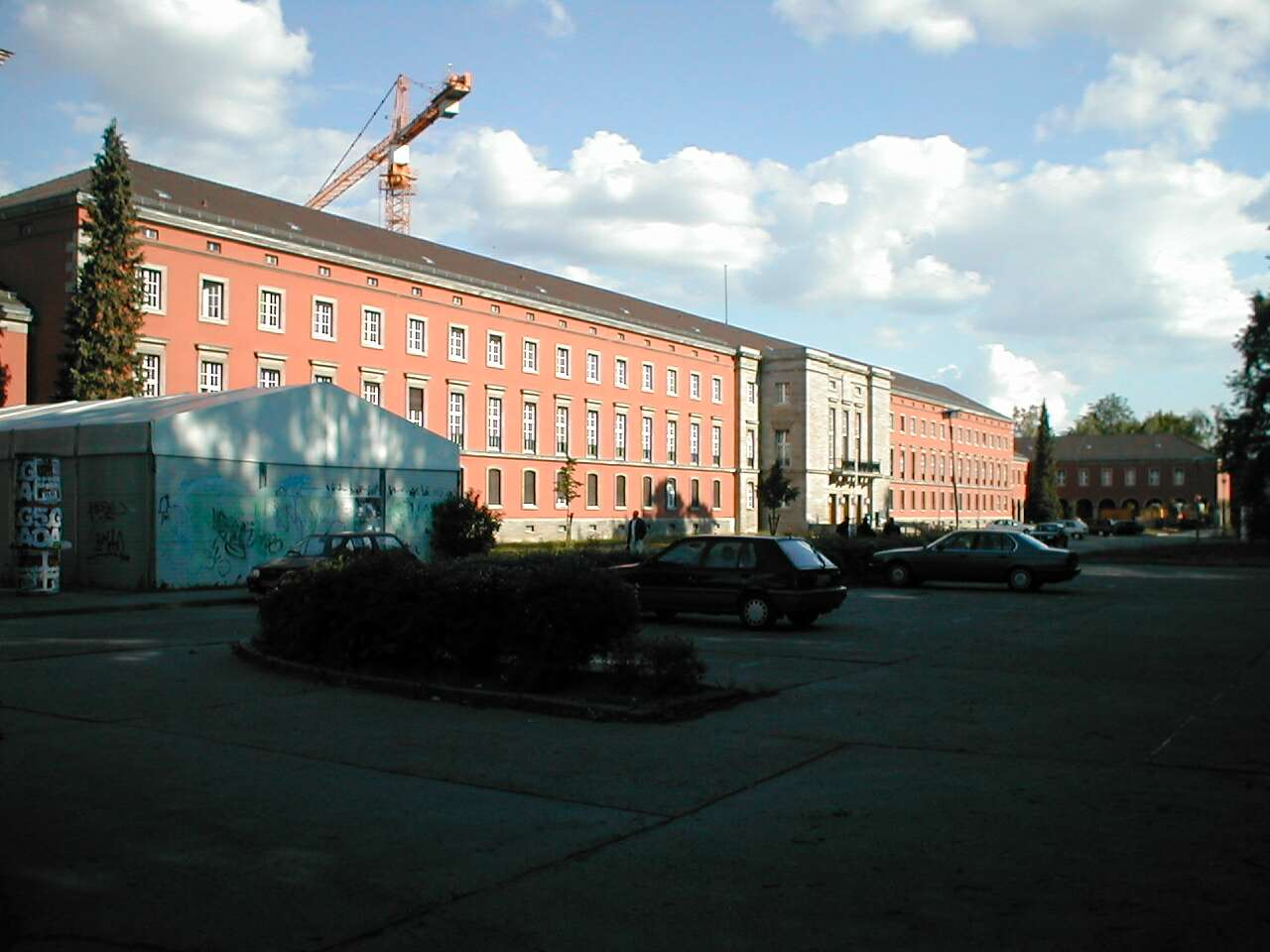
Babelsberg campus – House 1

Some parts of the university are located in historical buildings that have been named as World Heritage Sites by UNESCO. The university library and the Institute of History can be found in a part of the commons in the park of Sanssouci, at the New Palace, as can the Institute of Mathematics in the former stables.

The other campuses, Babelsberg and Golm, are also of historical interest. The oldest buildings of the Golm campus were built in the 1930s to house the Luftwaffe's intelligence department. After World War II the College of Law of the East German Ministry for State Security moved in.

The current Faculty of Law is located in Babelsberg/Griebnitzsee in the former presidial and administrative buildings of the German Red Cross (1939/40). Other lecture halls and buildings were built in the 1950s directly behind the Schloss Babelsberg for the Academy of Justice and the East German state.

== Campuses ==
As the largest university in the state of Brandenburg, the University of Potsdam mainly stretches across three campuses on the city's outskirts:

=== New Palace ===
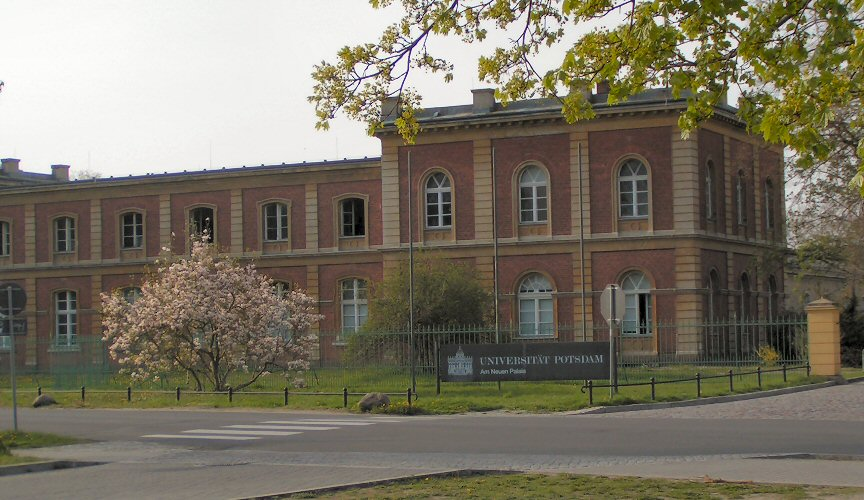
The New Palace campus of the University of Potsdam

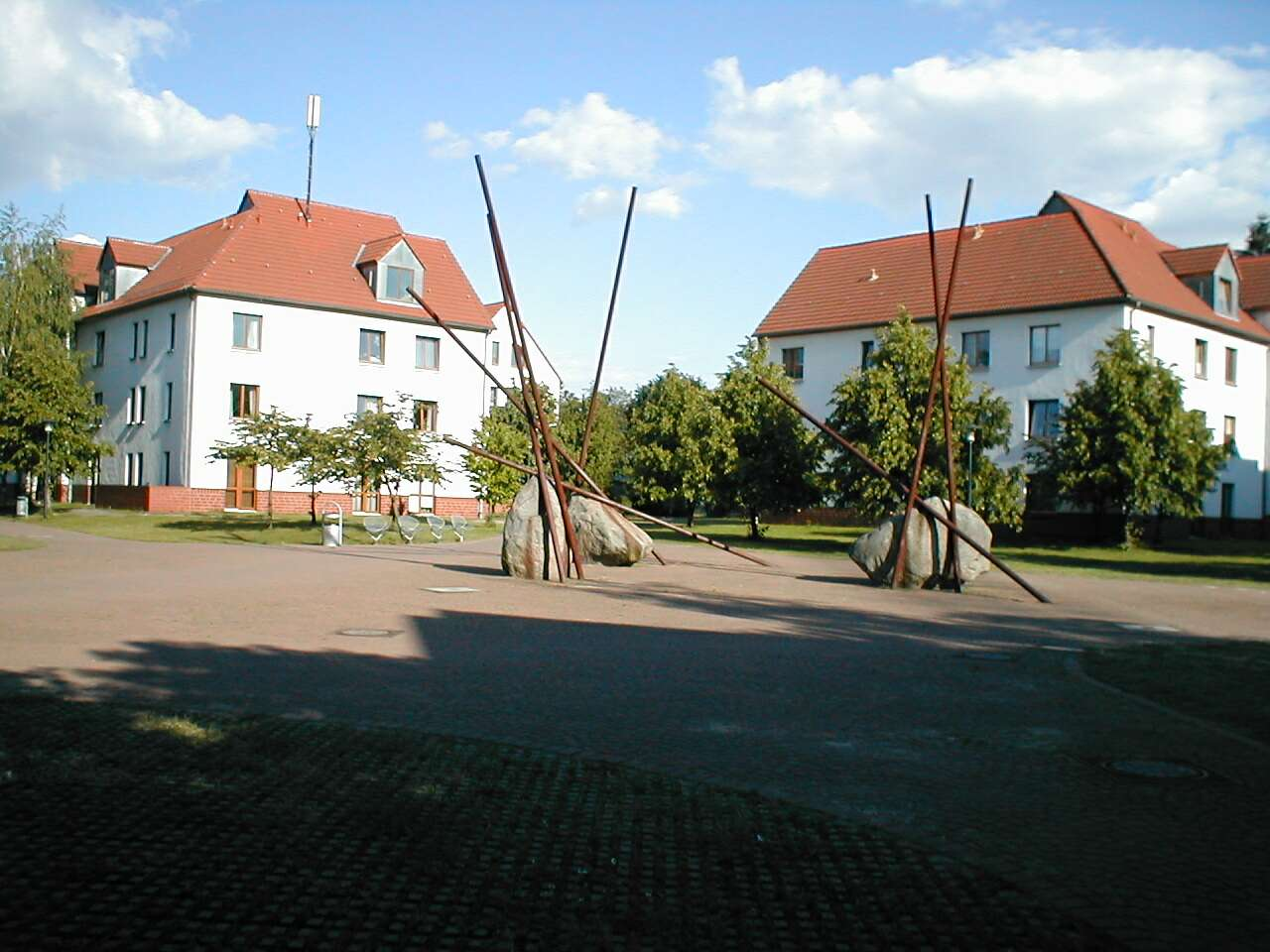
The student village on the Babelsberg Campus

New Palace, Sanssouci (Am Neuen Palais): Faculties of Philosophy, Institutes of Mathematics and Sports. The university's main campus, which includes the Auditorium Maximum, is situated in the immediate proximity of Park Sanssouci. The Communs – the prestigious annexes of the New Palace are home to some of the institutes of the Faculty of Arts. The eighteenth century baroque buildings, which disguise their former purpose as the Palace's offices and service rooms with staircases, porticos, cupolas, and rich ornamentation, are currently home to the university's presidential office and administration. The Institutes of Sports Science and Sports Medicine as well as the Institute for Mathematics can be found on the Campus Am Neuen Palais.

=== Golm ===
Golm: Faculties of Humanities, Mathematics and Science. Most institutes of the Faculty of Science as well as the Human Sciences Faculty are located in Potsdam-Golm, forming one of the largest science parks in the region. The Institute of Computer Science moved to Campus Golm in 2021 following a donation for a new building by the Hasso Plattner Foundation. Three Max Planck Institutes and two Fraunhofer Institutes as well as the start-up center GO:IN have already settled here.

=== Babelsberg ===
Potsdam-Babelsberg/Griebnitzsee: Faculties of Law, Economics and Social Studies, the Hasso Plattner Institute for Software Systems Engineering. Campus Griebnitzsee is situated along the city border with Berlin, not far from the famous Babelsberg film studios, and houses the law faculty and the faculty of economics and social sciences. The Institute of Computer Sciences (located in Golm since 2021) works with the Hasso Plattner Institute for Software Systems Engineering, a completely privately funded co-institute of the University of Potsdam, to allow students to take courses at both institutes. Other small institutes and departments exist in the City of Potsdam. The Botanischer Garten Potsdam is the university's botanical garden.

== Academic profile ==
At the beginning of the winter semester of the 2020/2021 academic year, roughly 22,000 young people were studying at the University of Potsdam. The University is placing particular emphasis by establishing four university research focuses. Constantly increasing third-party funding volume testifies to the quality of the research conducted at the University today. The University of Potsdam also has successful, productive cooperative agreements with more than 30 non-university research institutions in the region. With interdisciplinary research agenda, the area of excellence links the departments of Psychology, Linguistics, and Sports and Health Science. UP offers more than 150 degree programs in various fields, offered in German as well as other languages, notably French and English.

=== Faculties ===
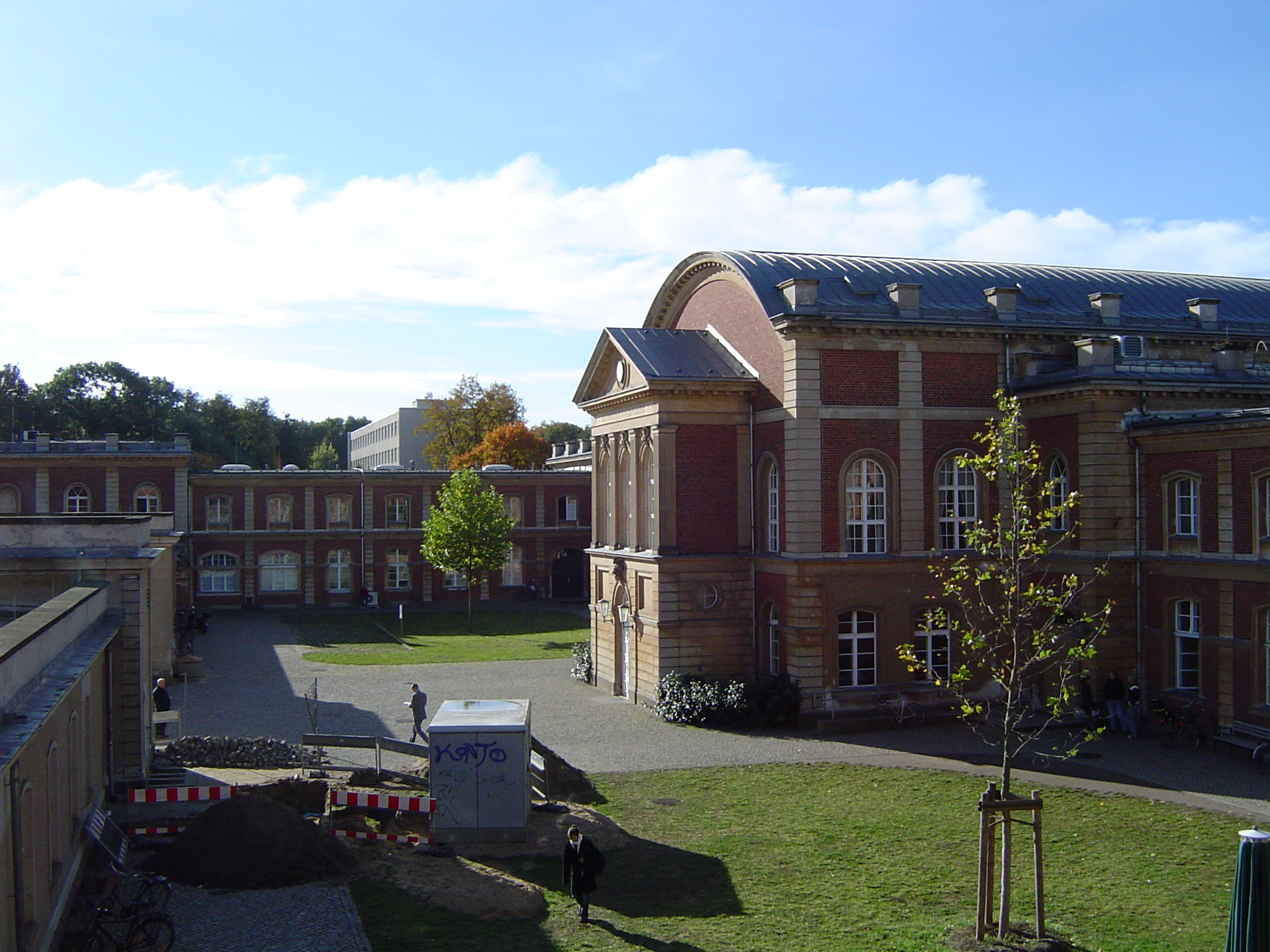
AudiMax (auditorium maximum) of the Potsdam University

As is common in Germany, the University of Potsdam's teaching and research programmes are carried out along the lines of faculties. The university contains the following faculties:

==== Digital Engineering Faculty ====
The Digital Engineering Faculty, jointly established by the University of Potsdam and the Hasso Plattner Institute (HPI), is the first privately funded department of a German public university.

==== Faculty of Law ====
The Law Faculty's curriculum offers the basic and required courses necessary to become a fully qualified lawyer. This training includes civil law, criminal law, and public law. At Potsdam, the areas of concentration in research and teaching comprise the fundamentals of law, civil judicature, business law, international law, public administration as well as business, tax, and environmental criminal law. All these areas offer ample opportunity for specialized study. Additional events for training and continuing education for practitioners in the municipal realm are offered by the Institute for Local Government Studies and in international relations by the Human Rights Centre. Furthermore, a German-French law program exists in cooperation with University Paris Ouest-Nanterre/La Défense.

==== Faculty of Philosophy ====
In recent years, the University of Potsdam's Philosophical Faculty has redefined itself in the spirit of cross-disciplinary cultural studies. Research and teaching at the Institutes for Religious Studies, Jewish Studies, Jewish Theology, Philosophy, History, Classical Philology, German Studies, English and American Studies, Romance Studies, Slavic Studies as well as Art and Media are devoted to a broad understanding of culture that is defined by including all aspects of human life.

Drawing from the broad range of faculty specialties, the thematic concentrations of "Cultures in/of Mobility", "Forms of Life and the Know How of Living" as well as "Region and Identity in Europe" were created. This emphasis in regard to content encourages interdisciplinary cooperation, but it also incorporates perspectives that are outside the Philosophical Faculty's traditional subject canon. The Focus Area Unsettled Cultures, for example, investigates among others the history and cultural practice of Judaism, Christianity, and Islam and thereby combines different areas of study, such as theology, literature, ethics, medicine, and cosmology.

In the spirit of research-based teaching, new academic programs such as Mobility Studies are being developed to complement the already existing interdisciplinary Master's programs in Jewish Studies, Communications Linguistics, Military Studies, European Media Studies as well as others. Furthermore, the faculty highly values the intensive support of young scholars. The graduate colleges, graduate schools, and externally funded projects under the auspices of the Philosophical Faculty offer young scholars the opportunity for interdisciplinary and international cooperation.

==== Faculty of Human Science ====
With the Cognitive Sciences and the Educational Sciences, the Faculty of Human Sciences includes two of the interdisciplinary focus areas of the University of Potsdam that operate beyond faculty boundaries. The Cognitive Sciences' excellence is based predominantly on the Collaborative Research Centre "Information Structure: The Linguistic Means for Structuring Utterances, Sentences and Texts." Empirical research is currently being expanded in the educational sciences, and it is closely linked to teaching. In the education and training of aspiring teachers in all faculties, the Faculty of Human Sciences occupies a central role.

The "Area of Excellence Cognitive Sciences" and the "Focus Area Educational Sciences" are divided into further research clusters and teaching units. Instruction in the departments of psychology, linguistics, sports, and health science is organized into educational science and teacher training. The research emphases are language, action and behavior, health, professional and popular sports, school and classroom as well as teaching across the life span.

In the future, the existing potentials in the area of health sciences and prevention will be developed into another focus area. The research area in health is currently already well connected with the support systems for professional sports. The Faculty of Human Sciences mediates between theory and real life in a variety of ways. It is a service provider for the city of Potsdam and the federal state of Brandenburg. It maintains several consultation centers for psychotherapy and speech therapy as well as a university clinic. The university clinic is currently licensed as an examination center of the German Olympic Sports Confederation. Ultimately, a regional health network will be developed in cooperation with other service providers.

Furthermore, the faculty is actively striving for more quality in training students by establishing national and international Master's and graduate programs and developing a system of quality assurance in teaching.

==== Faculty of Economics and Social Sciences ====
The Faculty of Economics and Social Sciences has the following fields of study: business administration and economics, political and administrative sciences, and sociology. Research and teaching are closely intertwined. The faculty is considered one of the most important German institutes for research, training, and consulting in the areas of policy research and administrative sciences. Another concentration in the field of innovation and technology is currently being developed.

Following a multi-theoretical approach, researchers are investigating the interactive relationship between politics, economy, and institutions at different levels and in different fields of activity. The interdisciplinary approach allows for a study of the interplay between the economy, public and private institutions, and policy-making. Problems of governance between state, economy, and civil society are just as much a concern as problems of governance within the very differentiated public sector. Political and administrative scientists, sociologists, and economists are working on collaborative projects. The interplay of different research approaches and methods creates empirical and theoretical knowledge that transmits a complex and differentiated picture of socioeconomic, cultural, and political developmental processes in modern societies—domestically as well as internationally.

The Faculty is very engaged in linking research and teaching to practice. Therefore, the outcomes of research in the areas start-up, consulting, and innovation directly benefit the faculty's Institute for Start-up and Innovation (BIEM CEIP), a central service institution for aspiring entrepreneurs. The Institute for Local Government Studies (KWI) conducts collaborative research with the law faculty in examining issues faced by municipalities in the new Länder and offers continuing education to its elected officials. Furthermore, the faculty's Potsdam Center for Public Policy and Management (PCPM) ensures active national and international knowledge transfer with its research and consulting projects as well as opportunities for academically-focused continuing education. The German Center for Higher Education Development considers the Master's and Ph.D. programs offered through the PCPM to be among the very best in Europe. Among these are the EAPAA-accredited international postgraduate Program in Public Policy and Management for public sector professionals in English language with the (MPM) Master of Public Management and its three streams: Public Policy and Administration (PPA), Global Public Policy (GPP) and GeoGovernance (GG), the German-French Master of European Governance and Administration (MEGA) and the Executive Master of Public Management (EMPM) Program with the Hertie School of Governance.

==== Faculty of Health Sciences ====
The Faculty of Health Sciences is a newly found joint faculty of the University of Potsdam, the Brandenburg Medical School Theodor Fontane and the Brandenburg University of Technology Cottbus-Senftenberg (still under development).

==== Faculty of Mathematics and Science ====
Under its roof, the Faculty of Science at the University of Potsdam contains the Institutes for Biochemistry and Biology, Chemistry, Nutrition Sciences, Geography, Earth and Environmental Sciences, Computer Sciences, Mathematics, Physics, Astronomy as well as the University of Potsdam Botanical Garden. Especially the study programs in Geoecology, Geoscience, Nutrition Science, Polymer Science, and Software Systems Engineering are in high demand.

The faculty has secured external funding and established research and teaching concentrations. Five of the university's eight focus areas are part of the Faculty of Science: Earth Sciences, Functional Soft Matter, Functional Ecology and Evolution, Complex Systems, and Plant Genomics/Systems Biology. The faculty's concentrations, such as teacher training in mathematics and natural sciences, align with these focus areas to support their interconnectedness and development.

The close cooperation between the natural sciences and extramural research institutions in the Berlin-Brandenburg region, already intended in the University of Potsdam's founding concept, was praised very early on by the German Council of Science and Humanities. The collaboration with several institutes of the Max Planck Society, the Fraunhofer-Gesellschaft, the Helmholtz Association, the Leibniz Association, and the Hasso Plattner Institute for Software Systems Engineering exemplify this extensive networking. Currently, there are more than 40 joint professorships with these institutions.

=== Studies and Students ===
The university is the largest institution of higher education in the state of Brandenburg. It has repeatedly received the "Excellence in Teaching" Award from the Standing Conference of the Ministers of Education and Cultural Affairs of the Länder in the Federal Republic of Germany. The University of Potsdam offers 170 degree programs. It is not considered a "Volluniversität", i.e. a university offering courses in all traditional disciplines, since it does not comprise institutions for degrees in Medicine and Engineering. It also offers English-language Master's degree programs and courses. In addition, the university provides seminars, workshops and Executive Master's degree programs to career entrants and managerial staff.

Students in Brandenburg are not charged for tuition. There is, however, a small administrative fee for each semester, which includes a public transport ticket for Berlin and Brandenburg for six months and amounted to EUR 304.16 in 2020.

==== Degree Programs ====
The University of Potsdam confers the following academic degrees for its undergraduate and graduate programs:

- Bachelor of Arts (B.A.)
- Bachelor of Education (B.Ed.)
- Bachelor of Science (B.Sc.)
- First State Examination in Law or Bachelor of Laws (LL.B.)
- Master of Arts (M.A.)
- Master of Education (M.Ed.)
- Master of Science (M.Sc.)
- Master of Business Administration (MBA)
- Master of European Governance and Administration
- Master of Laws (LL.M.)
- Magister Legum (LL.M.)

==== Overview of Degree Programs ====
List of single-subjects Bachelor's degree programs (language of instruction: German)
A
Angewandte Kultur- und Translationsstudien (deutsch-polnisch) | Single-subject Bachelor
Anglophone Postcolonial Studies | Single-subject Bachelor
B
Betriebswirtschaftslehre | Single-subject Bachelor
Biowissenschaften | Single-subject Bachelor
C
Chemie | Single-subject Bachelor
Computerlinguistik | Single-subject Bachelor
E
Ernährungswissenschaft | Single-subject Bachelor
Europäische Medienwissenschaft | Single-subject Bachelor
G
Geisteswissenschaften: Mensch, Kultur und Gesellschaft | Single-subject Bachelor
Geoökologie | Single-subject Bachelor
Geowissenschaften | Single-subject Bachelor
Geschichte, Politik und Gesellschaft | Single-subject Bachelor
I
Informatik/Computational Science | Single-subject Bachelor
Interdisziplinäre Russlandstudien | Single-subject Bachelor
IT-Systems Engineering | Single-subject Bachelor
J
Jüdische Theologie | Single-subject Bachelor
K
Kognitionswissenschaft | Ein-Fach-Bachelor
L
Linguistik | Single-subject Bachelor
Literaturen und Kulturen in Theorie und Praxis | Single-subject Bachelor
M
Mathematik | Single-subject Bachelor
P
Patholinguistik | Single-subject Bachelor
Philosophie | Single-subject Bachelor
Physik | Single-subject Bachelor
Politik und Wirtschaft | Single-subject Bachelor
Politik, Verwaltung und Organisation | Single-subject Bachelor
Psychologie | Single-subject Bachelor
R
Rechtswissenschaft | Single-subject Bachelor & First State Examination
S
Soziologie | Single-subject Bachelor
Sportmanagement | Single-subject Bachelor
Sporttherapie und Prävention | Single-subject Bachelor
Sprachen und Diversität | Single-subject Bachelor
Sprachen und Kulturen der Antike und des Mittelalters | Single-subject Bachelor
V
Volkswirtschaftslehre | Single-subject Bachelor
W
Wirtschaftsinformatik | Single-subject Bachelor

List of subjects for dual-subject Bachelor's degree programs (language of instruction: German)
A
Anglistik/Amerikanistik (First and second subject)
B
Betriebswirtschaftslehre (First and second subject)
E
Erziehungswissenschaft (First and second subject)
F
Französische Philologie (First and second subject)
G
Germanistik (First and second subject)
Geschichte (First and second subject)
Gräzistik (Second subject)
I
Italienische Philologie (First and second subject)
J
Jüdische Studien (First and second subject)
K
Kulturwissenschaft (First subject)
L
Linguistik (Second subject)
P
Philosophie (First and second subject)
Polonistik (First and second subject)
R
Religionswissenschaft (First and second subject)
Russistik (First and second subject)
S
Soziologie (Second subject)
Spanische Philologie (First and second subject)

List of subjects for teaching degree programs (language of instruction: German)
Primary Education
Deutsch | Primary Education
Englisch | Primary Education
Inklusionspädagogik (Deutsch & Mathematik) | Primary Education with a focus on special education
Kunst | Primary Education
Mathematik | Primary Education
Musik | Primary Education
Sachunterricht | Primary Education
Sport | Primary Education
Special Education
Deutsch | Special Education
Englisch | Special Education
Mathematik | Special Education
Sport | Special Education
Wirtschaft-Arbeit-Technik | Special Education
Secondary Education Stages I and II
Biologie | Secondary Education Stages I and II
Chemie | Secondary Education Stages I and II
Deutsch | Secondary Education Stages I and II
Englisch | Secondary Education Stages I and II
Französisch | Secondary Education Stages I and II
Geographie | Secondary Education Stages I and II
Geschichte | Secondary Education Stages I and II
Informatik | Secondary Education Stages I and II
Kunst | Secondary Education Stages I and II
Latein | Secondary Education Stages I and II
Lebensgestaltung-Ethik-Religionskunde | Secondary Education Stages I and II
Mathematik | Secondary Education Stages I and II
Mathematik und Physik im Verbund | Secondary Education Stages I and II
Musik | Secondary Education Stages I and II
Physik | Secondary Education Stages I and II
Politische Bildung | Secondary Education Stages I and II
Polnisch | Secondary Education Stages I and II
Russisch | Secondary Education Stages I and II
Spanisch | Secondary Education Stages I and II
Sport | Secondary Education Stages I and II
Wirtschaft-Arbeit-Technik | Secondary Education Stages I and II
Teaching Degree for Secondary Education Stage II (Vocational Subjects) (only Master's degree programs)
Informatik (general subject)
Mathematik (general subject)
Wirtschafts- und Sozialkunde und Politische Bildung (general subject)
Technikdidaktik (Berufspädagogik) (vocational subject)
Wirtschaft und Verwaltung (vocational subject)

List of Master's degree programs
A
Angewandte Kulturwissenschaft und Kultursemiotik | Master
Anglophone Modernities in Literature and Culture | Master
Astrophysics | Master
B
Betriebswirtschaftslehre | Master
Biochemistry and Molecular Biology | Master
Bioinformatics | Master
Business Administration (MBA) | Master
C
Chemistry of Functional Molecules and Materials | Master
Climate, Earth, Water, Sustainability | Master
Clinical Exercise Science | Master/Ph.D.
Cognitive Science
Cognitive Systems: Language, Learning, and Reasoning | Master
Computational Science | Master
Computer Science | Master
D
Data Science | Master
Demografieorientiertes Sport- und Gesundheitsmanagement | Master
Deutsch-Französischer Masterstudiengang Rechtswissenschaften | Master
Digital Health | Master
Digitale Bildung | Master
E
Ecology, Evolution, and Conservation | Master
Economic Policy and Quantitative Methods | Master
Ernährungswissenschaft | Master/Ph.D.
Europäische Medienwissenschaft | Master
European Film Business and Law | Master (LL.M.)
European Film Business and Law | Master (MBA)
European Governance and Administration | Master
F
Frühkindliche Bildungsforschung | Master
G
General Management | Master
Geoökologie | Master
Geoscienes | Master
Germanistik | Master
Geschichtswissenschaften | Master
I
Integrative Sport-, Bewegungs- und Gesundheitswissenschaft | Master
Intercultural Communication and Management | Master
Internationale angewandte Kulturwissenschaft und Kultursemiotik | Master
Internationale Beziehungen | Master
International Experimental and Clinical Linguistics | Master/Ph.D.
International War Studies | Master
J
Jüdische Studien | Master
Jüdische Theologie | Master
L
Linguistics: Empirical and Theoretical Foundations | Master
Linguistik im Kontext: Erwerb – Kommunikation – Mehrsprachigkeit | Master
M
Mathematics | Master
Medienrecht und -management – Digital Media Law and Management | Master (LL.M.)
Medienrecht und -management – Digital Media Law and Management | Master (MBA)
N
National and International Administration and Policy | Master/Ph.D.
O
Osteuropäische Kulturstudien | Master
P
Philosophie | Master
Physik | Master
Politikwissenschaft | Master
Polymer Science | Master
Psychologie mit den Schwerpunkten Arbeits- und Organisationspsychologie oder Kognition und Verhalten | Master
Psychologie mit dem Schwerpunkt Klinische Psychologie und Psychotherapie | Master
Psychologische Bildungsforschung | Master
Public Health, Exercise, and Nutrition | Master
R
Rechtswissenschaft | Magister Legum
Remote Sensing, geoInformation and Visualization | Master
Romanische Philologie | Master
S
Schul- und Bildungsmanagement | Master
Soziologie | Master
Steuerrecht | Master
T
Toxicology | Master
U
Unternehmens- und Steuerrecht | Master
V
Vergleichende Literatur- und Kunstwissenschaft | Master
Verwaltungswissenschaft | Master
W
War and Conflict Studies | Master
Wirtschaftsinformatik und Digitale Transformation | Master
Z
Zeitgeschichte | Master

List of English-language programs
A
Anglophone Modernities in Literature and Culture | Master
Anglophone Postcolonial Studies | Single-subject Bachelor
Astrophysics | Master
B
Biochemistry and Molecular Biology | Master
Bioinformatics | Master
Business Administration (MBA) | Master
C
Chemistry of Functional Molecules and Materials
Climate, Earth, Water, Sustainability | Master
Clinical Exercise Science | Master/Ph.D.
Cognitive Science
Cognitive Systems: Language, Learning, and Reasoning | Master
Computational Science | Master
Computer Science | Master
Cybersecurity | Master
D
Data Science | Master
Digital Health | Master
E
Ecology, Evolution, and Conservation | Master
Economic Policy and Quantitative Methods | Master
European Film Business and Law | Master (LL.M.)
European Film Business and Law | Master (MBA)
G
General Management | Master
Geosciences | Master
I
Intercultural Communication and Management | Master
International Experimental and Clinical Linguistics | Master/Ph.D.
International War Studies | Master
J
Jewish Theology | Master
L
Linguistics: Empirical and Theoretical Foundations | Master
M
Mathematics | Master
N
National and International Administration and Policy | Master/Ph.D.
P
Polymer Science | Master
Public Health, Exercise, and Nutrition | Master
R
Remote Sensing, geoInformation and Visualization | Master
T
Toxicology | Master

List of continuing education Master's degree programs
B
Business Administration (MBA) | Master (continuing)
D
Demografieorientiertes Sport- und Gesundheitsmanagement | Master (continuing)
E
European Film Business and Law | Master (LL.M.) (continuing)
European Film Business and Law | Master (MBA) (continuing)
European Governance and Administration (MEGA) | Master (continuing)
G
General Management | Master (continuing)
I
Intercultural Communication and Management | Master (continuing)
M
Medienrecht und -management – Digital Media Law and Management | Master (LL.M., continuing)
Medienrecht und -management – Digital Media Law and Management | Master (MBA, continuing)
R
Rechtswissenschaft | Magister Legum (continuing)
S
Schul- und Bildungsmanagement | Master (continuing)
Steuerrecht | Master (continuing)
U
Unternehmens- und Steuerrecht | Master (continuing)

To view the lists, click on "show" on the right-hand side.

==== Teacher Education ====
With more than 4,600 students pursuing teacher education programs, the University of Potsdam is the largest teacher training institution in the state of Brandenburg. Prospective educators are prepared for their work in schools and future educational challenges through the provision of well-founded subject knowledge, educational science competencies, didactic expertise, and a substantial practical component.

Currently, the University of Potsdam offers educational programs for the following teaching qualifications:

1. Primary School Teacher Education
2. Primary School Teacher Education with a focus on Special Education
3. Secondary School Teacher Education (general subjects)
4. Secondary School Teacher Education (vocational subjects) (only Master's degree programs)
5. Special Education Teacher Education

In the teacher education programs at the University of Potsdam, two subjects are combined, each with equal weight. An exception is the Special Education Teacher Education program, where one subject is studied in combination with two areas of specialization.

The teacher education programs at the University of Potsdam are characterized by a significant practical component, including five accompanying internships. These internships include an orientation internship (classroom observation) during the bachelor's program, an integrated entry internship (classroom observation) for primary school teacher education students, an internship in pedagogical-psychological fields (e.g., in a kindergarten), and subject-specific didactic internships in the chosen teaching subjects (comprising observation and independent teaching).

In the master's program, a full teaching internship is completed at a school (comprising observation and independent teaching), accompanied by a Psychodiagnostics Internship (application and practice of psychodiagnostic methods). The teaching internship can be completed both domestically and abroad.

An exception is the master's program for teaching at Secondary Level (vocational subjects). For this teaching program, the teaching internship is waived, but the preparatory service is extended to 18 months. However, an orientation internship, an internship in pedagogical-psychological fields of vocational education, and subject-specific didactic internships in both subjects must still be completed.

==== Facts and Figures ====
In the winter semester 2024/2025, 19,691 students were enrolled at the University of Potsdam. International students make up 15% of the student body. 4,532 new students took up their studies at the Potsdam alma mater in the winter semester 2024/2025.

==== Distribution of Students in the Faculties (winter semester 2023/2025) ====
- Law Faculty: 2,668
- Faculty Of Arts: 4,815
- Faculty Of Human Sciences: 3,925
- Faculty of Economics and Social Sciences: 3,242
- Faculty Of Science: 4,737
- Digital Engineering Faculty: 1,015
- Faculty of Health Sciences: 0 (still under development)

==== Student Representation ====
The students are represented directly by the Student Parliament, the General Students' Committee (AStA) and the Departmental Student Representative Committees.

==== Student life ====
More than 60 student organizations are registered as associations at the university. They enable students to pursue political or cultural interests, organize social projects, such as a student-run crisis hotline, and establish contacts beyond their degree program. The University Athletic Department offers up to 200 different courses for a small fee. This also includes unusual sports like historical sword fighting. There are dining halls on every campus run by the Potsdam Association for Student Affairs with main courses starting at EUR 2.15. The Association for Student Affairs also provides accommodation for 2,855 students in the city of Potsdam. The "Nil" club on the Am Neuen Palais campus has been run by students since 1999. In Potsdam's city center, students also manage the Student Cultural Center "KuZe" and the "Pub à la Pub" bar.

=== Notable research centres and institutes ===
Within faculties, teaching and research activities may be further decentralised through departments, graduate schools or institutes. For example,

- PCPM, Potsdam Center for Policy and Management, which has earned the University of Potsdam a reputation as one of the leading competence centers for Governance and the Public Sector. A recent reputation study by the German Association for Political Science has declared the University of Potsdam one of the three most important German universities and research institutions in the area of policy research and administrative sciences. The Center for Higher Education Development considers the Master's and Ph.D. programs offered here to be among the very best in Europe. Among these are the EAPAA-accredited international postgraduate Program in Public Policy and Management for public sector professionals in English language with the (MPM) Master of Public Management and its three streams: Public Policy and Administration (PPA), Global Public Policy (GPP) and GeoGovernance (GG), the German-French Master of European Governance and AdministrationEuropean Governance and Administration (MEGA) and the Executive Master of Public Management (EMPM) Program with the Hertie School of Governance.
- BIEM-CEIP, Institute for Start-ups, Entrepreneurship and Innovation
- KWI, Institute for Local Government Studies
- The Hasso Plattner Institute for Software Systems Engineering is the first, and currently the only university institute that is completely privately financed. Hasso Plattner, co-founder and advisory board chairman of the software company SAP, created the opportunity for a unique academic elite-education in IT systems technology. Meeting the demands of the industry, about a dozen professors and more than fifty additional visiting professors and lecturers are currently training about 450 highly talented young people in the Bachelor and Master's programs to become IT systems engineers.
- The Hasso Plattner Institute of Design integrates product design, engineering, and business management education, in cooperation with Stanford University. While it is located in Stanford University, it is a joint project and a degree with respective content is also offered through the Hasso Plattner Institute in Potsdam.
- The Abraham Geiger College is the first rabbinical seminary in Central Europe after 1945. When the Nazis closed the Higher Institute for Jewish Studies (Hochschule für die Wissenschaft des Judentums) in Berlin in 1942, it meant the end of an era that had begun with Abraham Geiger. In 1836 Geiger had called for the founding of a Jewish theological department at a German university that would be dedicated to Jewish tradition in the spirit of academic freedom. Today, the Abraham Geiger College provides education for rabbis and cantors for Jewish communities in Central and Eastern Europe. Besides vocational training, participants go through a regular university program of study that is integrated into the extensive curriculum of the School of Jewish Theology at the University of Potsdam and that must be completed with a B.A. for cantors and an M.A. for rabbis. After completing the degree and contingent upon agreement of supervisors and mentors, the rabbinical college then recommends candidates for ordination into the Jewish clergy.
- The Moses Mendelssohn Center for European-Jewish Studies focuses on the history, religion, and culture of Jews and Judaism in European countries. A special accent is placed on the history of relations between Jews and their non-Jewish environment. On the one hand, research is concerned with the problems of social integration and acculturation faced by Jews, and on the other hand it focuses on comparative social historical questions related to living conditions and to geographical as well as social mobility. Further areas of research include hostility towards Jews as well as historical and contemporary antisemitism. Much attention is also given to sociocultural and intellectual-historical aspects, such as literature, art, religion, philosophy, and music. The Moses Mendelssohn Center owns an extensive and publicly accessible specialized library that currently holds around 50,000 volumes.
- The Potsdam Graduate School, which sees its primary task in the promotion of already accredited doctoral candidates and post-doctorals as well as in the continuous optimization of doctoral conditions and quality management. The Potsdam Graduate School stands for transparency within doctoral procedures and the intensification and improvement of doctoral supervision.

=== Supportive institutions ===
- The Language Centre offers students of all faculties the chance to learn many languages at various levels of proficiency, and holds a collegial certificate of international accreditation from UNIcert.
- The Career Service supports students and graduates during the transition phase from study into practice.
- Sports center
- Computing center
- AStA – Students' union executive committee
- International Relations Office
- Studentenwerk Potsdam
- University Library

=== Tuition fees and scholarships ===
Tuition fees at University of Potsdam vary, depending on nationality and programme of study. For German and EU/EEA students there is currently no tuition fee, however, several additional fees such as for the students union as well as mandatory public transportation tickets for students have to be paid. For non-EU/EEA students tuition fees may apply.

For both EU/EEA students as well as non-EU/EEA students a variety of financial assistance and scholarships is available. The University of Potsdam does not provide scholarships directly. Among others, the German Academic Exchange Service (Deutscher Akademischer Austauschdienst – DAAD) offers a very extensive scholarship programme. Students or post-graduates can apply for a wide variety of scholarships, but the conditions and opportunities vary according to the country of origin and field of study. Other scholarship providers also have varying prerequisites regarding country of origin, field of study, prior academic performance, the duration of the scholarship, etc.

The prerequisites and the weighting of the various criteria for stipends are determined by the individual profiles of the foundation providing for the scholarships. For example, one's previous marks or grades are weighted differently by the various foundations. For some foundations, previous marks are weighted as the main criteria, and the social situation of the applicant is given significantly less weight. For other scholarships, good marks are important in order to receive a scholarship, but this does not mean that an applicant qualifies for one. Many foundations give significant weight to financial need, engagement in the civil society, or a developed personal profile. Willingness to participate in the respective foundation's programme is also important to some foundations. Information is available at University of Potsdam for students wishing to apply.

=== Rankings ===
University rankings

Overall – Global & National
QS World 2024	460	25
THE World 2024	201-250	22-24
ARWU World 2023	401-500	25-31

The University of Potsdam is ranked within several well-recognized global college and university rankings. According to the QS World University Rankings 2024, it holds the 460th position worldwide and the 25th place within Germany. Similarly, the Times Higher Education World University Rankings (THE) for 2024 rank the institution between 201-250 globally and approximately 22-24 nationally. Furthermore, the Academic Ranking of World Universities (ARWU) 2023 positions the University of Potsdam within the 401-500 bracket on the international stage, and within the 25-31 range in Germany.

The University of Potsdam was ranked #30 in the World in the Times Higher Education Young University Rankings 2021. It was also ranked #41 in the world in Nature's Top 175 Young Universities Ranking.

The university has a particularly strong linguistics programme, ranked #51–100 in the QS World University Rankings for Linguistics. The Digital Engineering faculty, which is led by the Hasso Plattner Institute, runs Germany's top-ranked computer science-related study programme according to the CHE 2019/2020 ranking, which is Germany's largest academic ranking.

== International partnerships ==
A cooperation among the universities in Berlin (Humboldt University of Berlin, Technische Universität Berlin, Free University of Berlin) and University of Potsdam exists, which allows students of these universities to take courses at the respective partner universities, in accordance with their curriculum.

The University of Potsdam is well connected: it has found scientific partners of international standing with the Potsdam-Institute for Climate Impact Research and the German Institute for Human Nutrition – both institutes of the Leibniz Association – as well as the Helmholtz Centre Potsdam – German Research Centre for Geosciences. Close cooperation and joint professorships also exist with the Max Planck Institute for Molecular Plant Physiology, the Max Planck Institute of Colloids and Interfaces, the Max Planck Institute for Gravitational Physics, and many other research institutions. Last but not least, the university collaborates with both institutes of the Fraunhofer Gesellschaft in the Science Park Potsdam-Golm, a research campus that is growing in significance far beyond Germany's borders. Similarly, the Hasso Plattner Institute of University of Potsdam in cooperation with Stanford University offers a design school based in Stanford University, the Hasso Plattner Institute of Design. While it is located at Stanford University, various partnerships as well as a degree is offered through University of Potsdam. The university offers a number of German courses, organizes intercultural training workshops, and matches up tandem-partners who want to learn one another's language. Selected study programs, in particular several Master programs, may also be completed in English.

International partnerships offer opportunities to spend one semester or a full year at one of many partner universities. This includes Jewish studies in Israel, sports management in Australia, and language and politics in Moscow. Potsdam is a popular choices both for the Erasmus and Tempus as well as for the Fulbright program and the international programs of the German Academic Exchange Service (DAAD).

- Several exchange programs and partnerships exist. An institution at Potsdam's Law Faculty that is unique in Germany is the German-French law program, which is operated in cooperation with the partner University Paris Ouest-Nanterre/La Défense. At the University of Potsdam students can participate not just in an exchange program, but they also have the opportunity in their first two years in the standard German law program to complete an additional, self-contained program of study in French law. This French part of the program is taught by French visiting scholars from the partner university and is conducted in French.

=== International doctoral studies ===
University of Potsdam offers international students the completion of a doctoral thesis. Doctoral students in Germany generally pursue their doctorates in the context of individual research projects, rather than in structured programmes as in many other countries. Upon completion of a dissertation project, one receives a doctoral degree for individual scholarly achievements.

The prerequisite for doctoral studies is an above average graduate degree, Master's of Arts, Master's of Science, Diploma, Staatsexamen or another equivalent degree. The doctoral examination board (Promotionsausschuss) of your institute of interest, or the dean of the law faculty respectively, is responsible for determining questions of equivalency. Writing a dissertation should take no longer than three years. After submitting a dissertation and receiving a positive assessment, doctoral students are required to take part in a disputation.

== Voltaire Prize ==
The Voltaire Prize for Tolerance, International Understanding and Respect for Differences has been awarded by the university since 2017. It is awarded "for the scientific examination of the topics of international understanding, tolerance and respect for differences and which honors scientists who are committed to freedom in research and education and advocate freedom of expression". As of 2021, the prize is worth €5,000, and sponsored by the Friede Springer Foundation. The university aligns itself with Voltaire's and La Mettrie's contribution to the Age of Enlightenment.

Recipients of the prize include:

- 2017: Hilal Alkan, Turkish political scientist
- 2018: Gladys Tzul Tzul, Guatemalan sociologist
- 2019: Ahmad Milad Karimi, Afghan philosopher
- 2020: Gábor Polyák, Hungarian media scientist
- 2021: Elisabeth Kaneza, Rwandan political scientist and legal scholar
- 2022: Duong Keo, Cambodian historian and political scientist
- 2023: Amy Lai, Hong Kong-born lawyer and author
- 2024: Gerawork Teferra Gizaw, from Ethiopia and Olga Shparaga, Belarusian philosopher and political activist
- 2025: Rosario Figari Layús, Argentinian sociologist

== See also ==
- Universities and research institutions in Berlin
