= Dependency theory (database theory) =

Subfield of database theory

Dependency theory is a subfield of database theory which studies implication and optimization problems related to logical constraints, commonly called dependencies, on databases. The best known class of such dependencies are functional dependencies, which form the foundation of keys on database relations. Another important class of dependencies are the multivalued dependencies. A key algorithm in dependency theory is the chase, and much of the theory is devoted to its study.

== Dependencies ==
Some recognized dependency types are:

- Functional dependency
- Join dependency
- Multivalued dependency
- Tuple-generating dependency
- Transitive dependency
- Equality-generating dependency
- Embedded dependency
- Inclusion dependency
- Full typed dependency
