= Phokion G. Kolaitis =

American computer scientist

Phokion G, Kolaitis
- Born: 4 July 1950 (age 76); Athens, Greece
- Education: University of Athens; UCLA
- Awards: Guggenheim Fellowship; NKUA Honorary Doctorate; Alonzo Church Award
- Scientific career
- Fields: Database systems Logic in Computer Science; Computational Complexity
- Workplaces: UC Santa Cruz; IBM Research - Almaden
- Doctoral advisor: Yiannis N. Moschovakis
- Website: users.soe.ucsc.edu/~kolaitis/

Phokion Gerasimos Kolaitis ^{ACM} (born 4 July 1950) is a computer scientist who is currently a Distinguished Research Professor at UC Santa Cruz and a Principal Research Staff Member at the IBM Almaden Research Center. He is known for his work on principles of database systems, logic in computer science, computational complexity, and other related fields.

== Education ==
Kolaitis obtained a bachelor's degree in mathematics from the University of Athens in 1973 and a master's degree and Ph.D in Mathematics from the University of California, Los Angeles in 1974 and 1978, respectively.

== Career and research ==
Kolaitis is currently a Distinguished Research Professor at the Computer Science and Engineering Department of University of California, Santa Cruz. He is also a Principal Research Staff Member in the theory group at the IBM Almaden Research Center.

== Selected publications ==
Data exchange: semantics and query answering, R Fagin, PG Kolaitis, RJ Miller, L Popa, Theoretical Computer Science 336 (1), 89-124

Conjunctive-query containment and constraint satisfaction, PG Kolaitis, MY Vardi, Journal of Computer and System Sciences 61 (2), 302-332

Data exchange: getting to the core, R Fagin, PG Kolaitis, L Popa, ACM Transactions on Database Systems (TODS) 30 (1), 174-210

Composing schema mappings: Second-order dependencies to the rescue, R Fagin, PG Kolaitis, L Popa, WC Tan, ACM Transactions on Database Systems (TODS) 30 (4), 994-1055

On the decision problem for two-variable first-order logic, E Grädel, PG Kolaitis, MY Vardi, Bulletin of Symbolic Logic, 53-69

== Recognition ==
- 1993 Guggenheim Fellowship, John Simon Guggenheim Memorial Foundation
- 2005 Fellow, Association for Computing Machinery
- 2007 Foreign Member, Finnish Academy of Science and Letters
- 2008 Association for Computing Machinery PODS Alberto O. Mendelzon Test-of-Time Award for the paper “Conjunctive-Query Containment and Constraint Satisfaction” (co-authored with Moshe Y. Vardi)
- 2010 Fellow, American Association for the Advancement of Science
- 2013 International Conference on Database Theory Test-of-Time Award for the paper “Data Exchange: Semantics and Query Answering” (co-authored with R. Fagin, R.J. Miller, and L. Popa)
- 2014 Honorary Doctoral Degree, Department of Mathematics and Department of Informatics & Telecommunications, University of Athens, Greece
- 2014 Association for Computing Machinery PODS Alberto O. Mendelzon Test-of-Time Award for the paper “Composing Schema Mappings: Second-Order Logic to the Rescue” (co-authored with R. Fagin, L. Popa, and W.-C. Tan)
- 2017 Foreign Member, Academia Europaea
- 2020 Alonzo Church Award for Outstanding Contributions to Logic and Computation (Co-Winner)
