= David Maier =

American computer scientist (born 1953)

David Maier (born 2 June 1953) is the Maseeh Professor of Emerging Technologies in the Department of Computer Science at Portland State University. Born in Eugene, OR, he has also been a computer science faculty member at the State University of New York at Stony Brook (1978–82), Oregon Graduate Center (OGC, 1982–2001), University of Wisconsin (UW, 1997–98), Oregon Health & Science University (2001–present) and National University of Singapore (2012–15). He holds a B.A. in Mathematics and Computer Science from the University of Oregon (Honors College, 1974) and a Ph.D. in Electrical Engineering and Computer Science from Princeton University (1978).

Maier has been chairman of the program committee of ACM SIGMOD. He also served as an associate editor of ACM Transactions on Database Systems. Maier has consulted with Tektronix, Inc., Servio Corporation, the Microelectronics and Computer Technology Corporation (MCC), Digital Equipment Corporation, Altair Engineering, Honeywell, Texas Instruments, IBM, Microsoft, Informix, Oracle Corporation, NCR, and Object Design, as well as several governmental agencies. He is a founding member of the Data-Intensive Systems Center (DISC), a joint project of OGI and Portland State University. He is the author of books on relational databases, logic programming and object-oriented databases, as well as papers in database theory, object-oriented technology and scientific databases. He received the Presidential Young Investigator Award from the National Science Foundation in 1984 at OGC, and was awarded the 1997 SIGMOD Edgar F. Codd Innovations Award for his contributions in objects and databases at UW. He is also an ACM Fellow.

Maier established some of the earliest results on using the relational model. Together with his thesis advisor, Jeffrey Ullman, and fellow Princeton students, including Alberto O. Mendelzon and Yehoshua Sagiv, he co-authored a number of influential papers that laid out the fundamental issues and approaches for relational databases. In a now-famous paper (Maier, Mendelzon and Sagiv, ACM Trans. Database Syst. 1979), he introduced the chase, a method for testing implication of data dependencies that is now of widespread use in the database theory literature. This work has been highly influential: it is used, directly or indirectly, on an everyday basis by people who design databases, and it is used in commercial systems to reason about the consistency and correctness of a data design. New applications of the chase in meta-data management and data exchange are still being discovered.

He is credited for coining the term Datalog.
