= Leonid Libkin =

American computer scientist

- Born: 28 September 1965 (age 60)
- Education: University of Pennsylvania
- Awards: Royal Society Wolfson Research Merit Award Academia Europaea; Fellow of the RSE; ACM Fellow Marie Curie Chair
- Scientific career
- Workplaces: University of Edinburgh; École normale supérieure University of Toronto; Bell Labs
- Thesis: Aspects of Partial Information in Databases (1994)
- Doctoral advisor: Peter Buneman
- Website: homepages.inf.ed.ac.uk/libkin/

Leonid Libkin (born September 28, 1965) is a computer scientist who works in data management, in particular in database theory, and in logic in computer science.

Libkin is a professor at the University of Edinburgh, where he is chair of Foundations of Data Management in the School of Informatics, He previously worked at Bell Labs, at the University of Toronto, and at the École Normale Supérieure in Paris.

Libkin is the author of standard textbooks on finite model theory and on data exchange.

He is an ACM Fellow, a Fellow of the Royal Society of Edinburgh, and a member of Academia Europaea. He won best paper awards at the Symposium on Principles of Database Systems (ACM PODS) in 1999, 2003, and 2005, at International Conference on Database Theory (ICDT) in 2011, at the Principles of Knowledge Representation and Reasoning Conference in 2014 and 2018., at the ACM SIGMOD Conference (industry track) in 2023, and a test of time award at ICDT in 2023. He was program chair of ICDT in 2005, PODS in 2007 and ACM-IEEE Symposium on Logic in Computer Science (LICS) in 2021.

== Books ==
- Libkin, Leonid (2004). Elements of Finite Model Theory. Springer. ISBN 978-3-540-21202-7.
- Kuper, Gabriel; Libkin, Leonid; Paredaens, Jan (2010). Constraint Databases. Springer. ISBN 978-3-642-08542-0.
- Arenas, Marcelo; Barceló, Pablo; Libkin, Leonid; Murlak, Filip (2014). Foundations of Data Exchange. Cambridge University Press. ISBN 9781107016163.
