= Moshe Vardi =

Israeli mathematician and computer scientist

Moshe Vardi MAE ForMemRS
- משה ורדי
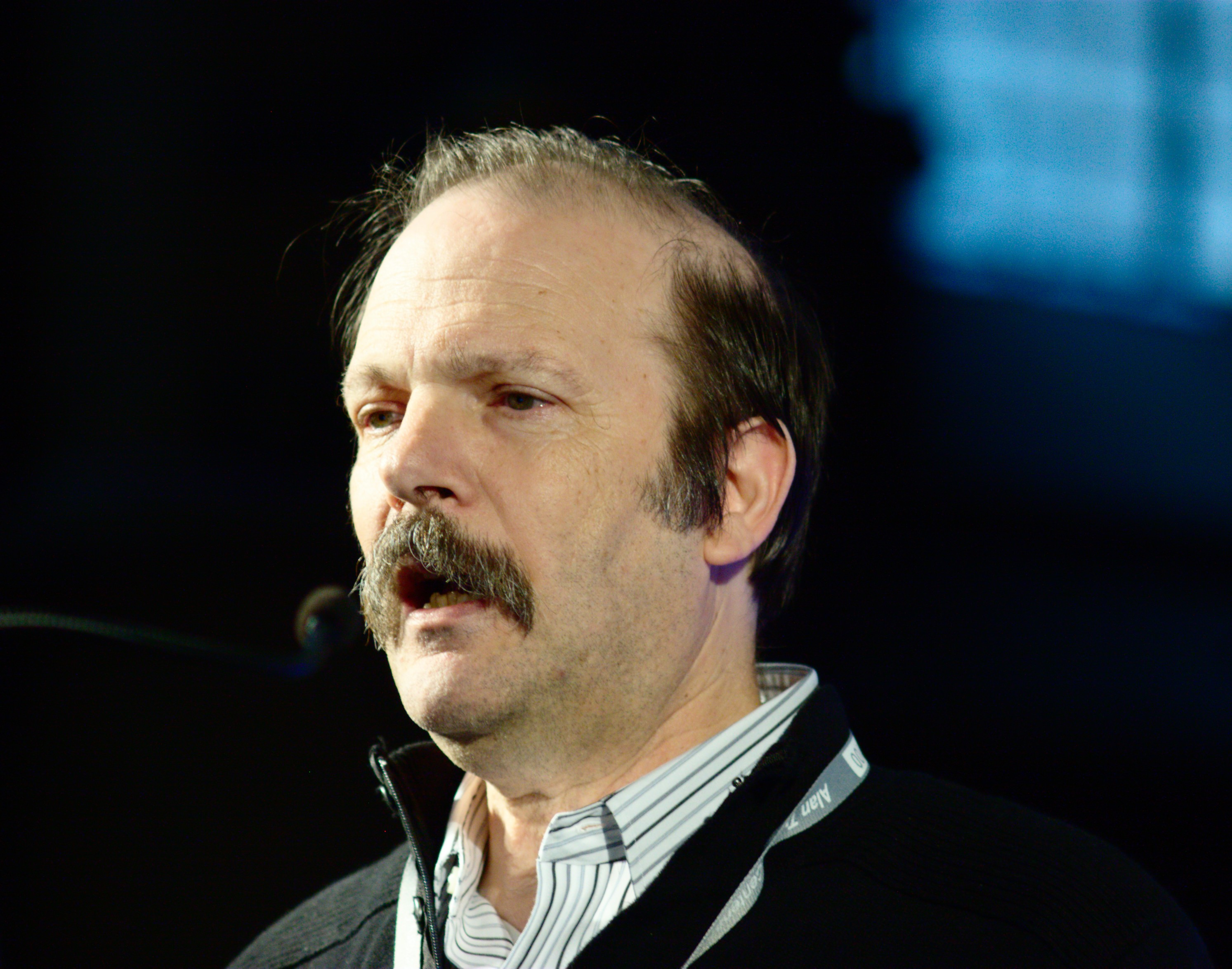
- Born: Moshe Ya'akov Vardi; Hebrew: משה יעקב ורדי; 1954 (age 71–72); Israel
- Education: Bar-Ilan University; Weizmann Institute of Science (MSc); Hebrew University of Jerusalem (PHD)
- Awards: ACM Fellow (2000); Gödel Prize (2000); AAAI Fellow (2004); Paris Kanellakis Award (2005); Harry H. Goode Memorial Award (2011); Member of the National Academy of Sciences (2015); Knuth Prize (2021)
- Scientific career
- Fields: Logic; Computation
- Workplaces: Rice University; IBM Research; Stanford University
- Thesis: The Implication Problem for Data Dependencies in the Relational Model (1981)
- Doctoral advisor: Catriel Beeri
- Doctoral students: Kristin Yvonne Rozier
- Website: www.cs.rice.edu/~vardi/

Moshe Ya'akov Vardi (Hebrew: משה יעקב ורדי) MAE ForMemRS is an Israeli theoretical computer scientist. He is the Karen Ostrum George Distinguished Service Professor in Computational Engineering at Rice University, United States. and a faculty advisor for the Ken Kennedy Institute. His interests focus on applications of logic to computer science, including database theory, finite model theory, knowledge of multi-agent systems, computer-aided verification and reasoning, and teaching logic across the curriculum. He is an expert in model checking, constraint satisfaction and database theory, common knowledge (logic), and theoretical computer science.

Vardi has authored or co-authored over 700 technical papers as well as editing several collections. He has authored the books Reasoning About Knowledge with Ronald Fagin, Joseph Halpern, and Yoram Moses, and Finite Model Theory and Its Applications with Erich Grädel, Phokion G. Kolaitis, Leonid Libkin, Maarten Marx, Joel Spencer, Yde Venema, and Scott Weinstein. He is senior editor of Communications of the ACM, after serving as its editor-in-chief for a decade.

== Education ==
Vardi was an undergraduate student at Bar-Ilan University and received his Master of Science degree from the Weizmann Institute of Science. His PhD was supervised by Catriel Beeri and awarded by the Hebrew University of Jerusalem in 1981.

== Career and research ==
Vardi's research interests are in logic and computation. He served as chair of the computer science department at Rice University from January 1994 until June 2002. Prior to joining Rice in 1993, he worked at IBM Research and was also a postdoctoral researcher at Stanford University. Vardi serves as an editor of several international journals and was formerly a director of the International Federation of Computational Logic Ltd. He has also co-chaired the Association for Computing Machinery (ACM) task force on job migration.

=== Awards and honors ===
Vardi is the recipient of three IBM Outstanding Innovation Awards, a co-winner of the 2000 Gödel Prize (for work on temporal logic with finite automata), winner of the Knuth Prize in 2021, a co-winner of the Paris Kanellakis Award in 2005, and a co-winner of the LICS 2006 Test-of-Time Award. He is also the recipient of the 2008 and 2017 ACM Presidential Award, the 2008 Blaise Pascal Medal in computational science by the European Academy of Sciences, the 2010 Distinguished Service Award from the Computing Research Association, the Institute of Electrical and Electronics Engineers (IEEE) Computer Society's 2011 Harry H. Goode Memorial Award, the 2018 ACM Special Interest Group for Logic and Computation (SIGLOG), the Distinguished Services Award from the European Association for Theoretical Computer Science (EATCS), the European Association for Computer Science Logic (EACSL), and the Kurt Gödel Society (KGS) jointly sponsored Alonzo Church Award for Outstanding Contributions to Logic and Computation (with Tomas Feder). In 2025, Vardi received the IEEE TCCH Outstanding Leadership Award from the IEEE Systems, Man, and Cybernetics Technical Committee on Cyber-Humanities, presented at IEEE CyberHumanities 2025 in Florence, recognizing his leadership at the intersection of computer science and the humanities. Vardi also holds honorary doctorates from eight Universities:

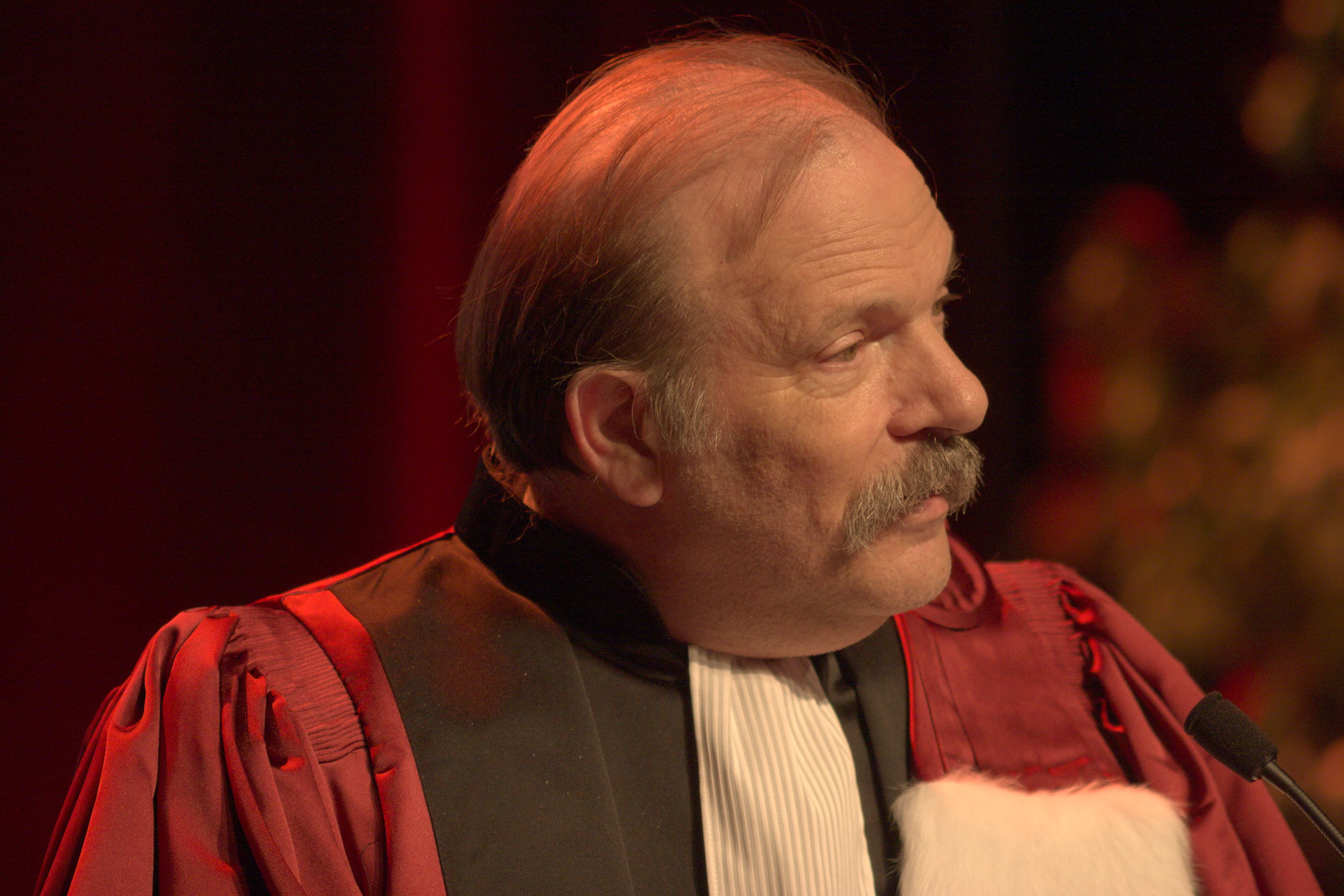
Vardi giving his acceptance speech for his honorary doctorate in Grenoble

1. Saarland University, Germany
2. University of Orléans
3. Grenoble Alpes University (UGA) in France
4. Federal University of Rio Grande do Sul (UFRGS) in Brazil
5. University of Liège in Belgium
6. TU Wien in Austria
7. University of Edinburgh in Scotland
8. University of Gothenburg in Sweden

Vardi is a Guggenheim Fellow, ACM Fellow, AAAI Fellow, Fellow of the American Association for the Advancement of Science and a Foreign Member of the Royal Society (ForMemRS). He was designated a highly cited researcher by the Institute for Scientific Information, and was elected as a member of the US National Academy of Engineering, the National Academy of Sciences. the European Academy of Sciences, and the Academia Europaea (MAE). He was elected a Fellow of the American Academy of Arts and Sciences in 2010. He was included in the 2019 class of fellows of the American Mathematical Society "for contributions to the development and use of mathematical logic in computer science".

== Personal life ==
Vardi lives with his wife Pamela Geyer in the Houston area. (As of March 2013, he was living in Bellaire, a suburb of Houston.) His step-son Aaron Hertzmann is a computer scientist at Adobe Research.

Vardi is open about his Zionism and is listed as a signatory on an anti-academic-boycott letter “United Against the Academic Boycott of Israel,” that denies that genocide has ever occurred in Palestine, despite an inquiry by a United Nations Independent International Commission and International Association of Genocide Scholars stating that the legal definition of genocide has been met according to the Genocide Convention. Vardi supports a two-state solution and served 5 years in the Israel Defense Forces, participating in two wars during his service. Vardi has remarked that boycotts against Israel on university campuses are "deeply distasteful".
