= Peter Buneman =

British computer scientist

- Born: Oscar Peter Buneman; 1943 (age 82–83)
- Education: Gonville and Caius College, Cambridge; University of Warwick
- Known for: Buneman graphs; query languages for nested relations; data provenance; data citation
- Awards: FRS (2009); Royal Society Wolfson Research Merit Award (2002); FRSE (2004); FACM (1999)
- Scientific career
- Fields: Computer Science
- Workplaces: University of Edinburgh; University of Pennsylvania; University of Cambridge; Laboratory for Foundations of Computer Science; Digital Curation Centre
- Thesis: Models of Learning and Memory (1970)
- Doctoral advisor: Christopher Zeeman
- Doctoral students: Wenfei Fan; Leonid Libkin; Wang-Chiew Tan
- Website: homepages.inf.ed.ac.uk/opb

Oscar Peter Buneman (born 1943) is a British computer scientist who works in the areas of database systems and database theory.

== Education ==
Buneman was educated at the University of Cambridge, where he was awarded a Bachelor of Arts while studying the Cambridge Mathematical Tripos at Gonville and Caius College, Cambridge. Buneman went on to study at the University of Warwick, where he received his PhD in 1970.

== Career ==
Following his PhD, Buneman worked briefly at the University of Edinburgh, followed by a professorship of computer science at the University of Pennsylvania, which he held for several decades. In 2002, he moved to the University of Edinburgh, where he built up the database research group. He is one of the founders and the associate director of research of the UK Digital Curation Centre, which is located in Edinburgh.

Buneman is known for his research in database systems and database theory, in particular for establishing connections between databases and programming language theory, such as introducing monad-based query languages for nested relations and complex object databases. He also pioneered research on managing semi-structured data, and, recently, research on data provenance, annotations, and digital curation.

In computational biology, he is known for his work on reconstructing phylogenetic trees based on Buneman graphs, which are named in his honour.

== Awards and honours ==
Buneman is a Fellow of the Royal Society, fellow of the ACM, a fellow of the Royal Society of Edinburgh, and has won a Royal Society Wolfson Research Merit Award. He has chaired both flagship research conferences in data management, SIGMOD (in 1993) and VLDB (in 2008), as well as the main database theory conference, PODS (in 2001).

Buneman was appointed Member of the Order of the British Empire (MBE) in the 2013 New Year Honours for services to data systems and computing. His nomination for the Royal Society reads

Peter Buneman is distinguished for his advances in uniting programming languages and databases. On the theoretical side this has involved new results in types, monads and structural recursion including (with his student Ohori) type inference for record types, and (with Tannen et al) results that demonstrated a tight connection between monad-based languages and those based on the predicate calculus. On the application side, he used these techniques to demonstrate that – contrary to an assertion by the US Department of Energy – queries on existing non-relational genomic databases could be directly evaluated; fruitful collaboration with biologists ensued.

This research carries over into his recent study of the principles of semistructured or "web-like" data. He is a leading proponent of this new field, and co-author of the first text book in it. Another recent concern is with the provenance of data on the Web, where data is continually copied and transformed. Already, with Khanna et al. he has built an efficient archiving system for scientific databases; more fundamentally, he seeks a formal basis for tracing provenance.

In addition to his work in databases, Buneman's early work on mathematical phylogeny underlies most modern phylogenetic reconstruction techniques.

== Personal life ==
Buneman is the son of physicist Oscar Buneman.
