= ICDT =

ICDT may refer to:

- International Centre for Democratic Transition, a non-profit organization about democratic transition
- International Conference on Database Theory, an annual research conference on database theory
