= Transitive dependency =

Relationship between software

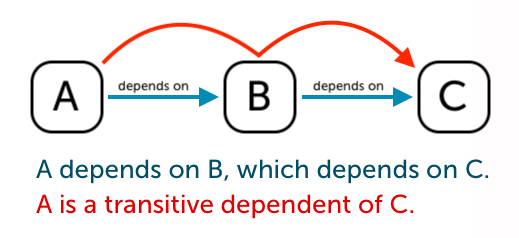
Illustration of a transitive dependency

A transitive dependency is an indirect dependency relationship between software components. This kind of dependency is held by virtue of a transitive relation from a component that the software depends on directly.

== Computer programs ==
In a computer program a direct dependency is functionality from a library, or API, or any software component that is referenced directly by the program itself. A transitive dependency is any dependency induced by a different component, that in turn is directly or indirectly referenced by the program. E.g. a call to a log() function may induce a transitive dependency to a library that manages the I/O of writing a message to a log file.

Dependencies and transitive dependencies can be resolved at different times, depending on how the computer program is assembled and/or executed: e.g. a compiler can have a link phase where the dependencies are resolved. Sometimes the build system even allows management of the transitive dependencies.

Similarly, when a computer uses services, a computer program can depend on a service that should be started before to execute the program. A transitive dependency in such case is any other service that the service we depend directly on depends on, e.g. a web browser depends on a Domain Name Resolution service to convert a web URL in an IP address; the DNS will depend on a networking service to access a remote name server. The Linux init system systemd is based on a set of configurations that declare the dependencies of the modules to be started: at boot time systemd analyzes all the transitive dependencies to decide the execution order of each module to start.

== Database management systems ==
Suppose entities A, B, and C exist such that the following statements hold:

1. A → B direct dependency relationship exists.
2. There is no B → A relationship.
3. B → C direct dependency relationship exists.

Then the functional dependency A → C is a transitive dependency (which follows the axiom of transitivity).

In database normalization of relational databases, one of the important features of third normal form is that it excludes certain types of transitive dependencies. E.F. Codd, the inventor of the relational model, introduced the concepts of transitive dependence and third normal form in 1971.

=== Example ===
A transitive dependency occurs in the following relation:

Book	Genre	Author	Author nationality
Twenty Thousand Leagues Under the Seas	Science fiction	Jules Verne	French
Journey to the Center of the Earth	Science fiction	Jules Verne	French
Leaves of Grass	Poetry	Walt Whitman	American
Anna Karenina	Literary fiction	Leo Tolstoy	Russian
A Confession	Autobiographical story	Leo Tolstoy	Russian

The functional dependency {Book} → {Author nationality} emerges; that is, if we know the book, we can know the author's nationality. Furthermore:

- {Book} → {Author}
- {Author} does not → {Book}
- {Author} → {Author nationality}

Therefore {Book} → {Author nationality} is a transitive dependency.
