= Alberto O. Mendelzon =

Argentine-Canadian computer scientist (1951–2005)

- Born: July 28, 1951; Buenos Aires, Argentina
- Died: June 16, 2005 (aged 53); Toronto, Ontario, Canada
- Education: Princeton University
- Known for: Chase; Web query languages Answering queries using views
- Awards: Member of the Royal Society of Canada
- Scientific career
- Fields: Computer Science
- Workplaces: University of Toronto
- Doctoral advisor: Jeffrey Ullman

Alberto O. Mendelzon was an Argentine-Canadian computer scientist who died on June 16, 2005.

== Life ==
Alberto Mendelzon was born in Buenos Aires, Argentina. He graduated from the University of Buenos Aires in 1973. He then received a Ph.D. degree from Princeton University in 1979, where his advisor was Jeffrey Ullman. After that he was a post-doctoral fellow at the IBM T.J. Watson Research Center for a year before joining the faculty of the University of Toronto in 1980.

He was one of the pioneers who helped to lay the foundations of relational databases. His early work on database dependencies has been influential in both the theory and practice of data management. He has made fundamental contributions in the areas of graphical query languages, knowledge-base systems, and on-line analytic processing. His work has provided the foundation for languages used to query the structure of the web.

Mendelzon established some of the earliest results on using the relational data model. Together with his thesis advisor, Jeffrey Ullman, and fellow Princeton students, including David Maier and Yehoshua Sagiv, he co-authored a number of influential papers that laid out the fundamental issues and approaches for relational databases. In a now-famous paper (Maier, Mendelzon and Sagiv, TODS 1979), he introduced the chase, a method for testing implication of data dependencies that is now of widespread use in the database theory literature. This work has been highly influential: it is used, directly or indirectly, on an everyday basis by people who design databases, and it is used in commercial systems to reason about the consistency and correctness of a data design. New applications of the chase in meta-data management and data exchange are still being discovered.

In the 1980s, Mendelzon began an important line of work on graphical query languages. His work has been called prescient as it began before the World Wide Web, and nonetheless established many of the scientific principles required for designing languages to query the Web.

More recently, Mendelzon was a central figure in the work on view-based querying. Starting with the innovative LMSS95 paper (Levy, Mendelzon, Sagiv, and Srivastava, PODS 1995) that introduced the problem of answering queries using views, Alberto Mendelzon made several important contributions to the emerging area of view-based modeling and processing.

His research was central to the development of many areas of database research such as database design, semantic query optimization, graphical query languages, and querying web data. In addition, he also made important contributions to recursive query languages, on-line analytic processing, similarity-based queries, data warehouses and view maintenance, algorithms for computing web page reputations, and indexing of XML data.

Mendelzon was an active member of both the database theory and database systems research communities. He served as the PC Chair for ACM PODS in 1991 and as General Chair in both 1997 and 1998. He served as PC Chair for VLDB in 1992, and as a member of the SIGMOD Executive Committee from 1998 to 2001. He was a member of the Royal Society of Canada.

== ACM PODS Mendelzon Test-of-Time Award ==
The ACM PODS Alberto O. Mendelzon Test-of-Time Award was established in 2007 and was awarded for the first time in 2008. It is awarded every year to a paper or a small number of papers published in the PODS proceedings ten years prior that had the most impact in terms of research, methodology, or transfer to practice over the intervening decade.

== Alberto Mendelzon International Workshop on Foundation of Databases and the Web (AMW) ==
Since 2006, the Alberto Mendelzon International Workshop on Foundation of Databases and the Web (AMW) brings together top researchers from all over the world, creating the opportunity to discuss and spread research results.

AMW
Workshop	Date	Place	Proceedings
AMW 2026	November 9–13, 2026	Arequipa, Peru	
AMW 2024	September 30—October 4, 2024	Mexico City, Mexico	
AMW 2023	May 22–26, 2023	Santiago, Chile	
AMW 2021	September 22–23, 2021	Virtual	
AMW 2019	June 3–7, 2019	Asunción, Paraguay	CEUR Vol-2369
AMW 2018	May 21–25, 2018	Cali, Colombia	CEUR Vol-2100
AMW 2017	June 5–9, 2017	Montevideo, Uruguay	CEUR Vol-1912
AMW 2016	June 6–10, 2016	Panama City, Panama	CEUR Vol-1644
AMW 2015	May 6–8, 2015	Lima, Peru	CEUR Vol-1378
AMW 2014	June 2–6, 2014	Cartagena, Colombia	CEUR Vol-1189
AMW 2013	May 21–23, 2013	Puebla, Mexico	CEUR Vol-1087
AMW 2012	June 27–30, 2012	Ouro Preto, Brazil	CEUR Vol-866
AMW 2011	May 9–12, 2011	Santiago, Chile	CEUR Vol-749
AMW 2010	May 17–20, 2010	Buenos Aires, Argentina	CEUR Vol-619
AMW 2009	May 12–15, 2009	Arequipa, Peru	CEUR Vol-450
AMW 2007	October 23–26, 2007	Punta del Este, Uruguay	
AMW 2006	November 2006	Laguna San Rafael National Park, Chile	

== Footnotes ==
- David Maier, Alberto O. Mendelzon, Yehoshua Sagiv: Testing Implications of Data Dependencies. ACM Trans. Database Syst. 4(4): 455-469 (1979).
- Alon Y. Levy, Alberto O. Mendelzon, Yehoshua Sagiv, Divesh Srivastava: Answering Queries Using Views. PODS 1995: 95-104.
