= Perugu Sree Sudha =

Judge of the Karnataka High Court
- Incumbent
- Assumed office 11 June 2025

Judge of the Telangana High Court
- In office 15 October 2021 – 1 May 2025

Personal details
- Spouse: Dr. P. Srikanth Babu
- Parents: Venkateswarlu (father); Padmavathi (mother)
- Education: A.C. College of Law, Guntur

Perugu Sree Sudha (also known as P. Sree Sudha) is an Indian judge who serving as judge of Karnataka High Court since from 11 June 2025. She was previously served as the Telangana High Court from 15 October 2021 to 1 May 2025.

== Early life and education ==
Perugu Sree Sudha was born to parents Venkateswarlu and Padmavathi. She completed her intermediate education in Kurnool. She obtained her degree from Pulivendula in Kadapa district and earned her LLB from the A.C. College of Law in Guntur.

== Personal life ==
She is married to Dr. P. Srikanth Babu, who serves in the Ayush department in Hyderabad.

== Legal career ==
=== District judiciary ===
Sudha enrolled as an advocate with the Bar Council of Andhra Pradesh and practiced in law Tenali, Srikalahasti and Kavali. She was selected as a direct recruit judge and inducted into the state judicial service on 21 August 2002.

During her service in the district judiciary, Sudha held various positions in Telangana and Andhra Pradesh. These included Additional District and Sessions Judge at, Nizamabad, special judge for bomb blast cases in Hyderabad and chairperson of Land Appellate Tribunal.

=== Telangana High Court ===
Sudha was appointed as a permanent judge of the Telangana High Court. She took office on 15 October 2021.

=== Transfer to Karnataka High Court ===
On 22 April 2025, the Supreme Court collegium headed by the Chief Justice of India Sanjeev Khanna recommended the transfer of Sudha from the Telangana High Court to the Karnataka High Court. The recommendation stated the purpose was to "infuse inclusivity and diversity at the high courtsand strengthen the quality of administration of justice". On 1 May 2025, the President of India formally ordered the transfer under Article 222 of the Constitution of India. Sudha assumed office at the Karnataka High Court on 11 June 2025, the oath administrated by the Governor of Karnataka Thawar Chandigarh Gehlot at Raj Bhavan in Bengaluru.

== Notable judgements ==
=== Telangana High Court ===
- In "Joshi Madhavi vs Union of India", a division bench that included Sudha examined the scope of remission authority between central and state governments. The court held that withholding consent for remission without consideration of state government opinion may constitute an abuse of executive discretion.
- In another matter, the court addressed questions regarding inheritance rights and the legal capacity of guardians to relinquish property rights on behalf of minor children. The court held that mothers cannot unilaterally relinquish the property rights of their minor children without appropriate legal authority.

=== Karnataka High Court ===
- In "Suresh Vathar vs Siddarama", a single bench decision by justice Perugu Sree Sudha examined evidentiary requirements in motor accident compensation appeals. The court held that a claimant must file a timely complaint and establish both the occurrence of the accident and the involvement of the vehicle to succeed in a claim.
- In another motor accident appeal, Justice Perugu Sree Sudha examined an appeal against a Motor accidents claim tribunal order. The court held that inexplicable delays in filing complaints and the absence of supporting documentation constitute material defeciencies in establishing liability and entitlement to compensation.
