= Canonical cover =

In relational database theory, a canonical cover, also known as minimal cover, F_{c} for F (a set of functional dependencies on a relation scheme) is a set of dependencies such that F logically implies all dependencies in F_{c}, and F_{c} logically implies all dependencies in F.

The set $F_c$ has two important properties:

1. No functional dependency in $F_c$ contains an extraneous attribute.
2. Each left side of a functional dependency in $F_c$ is unique. That is, there are no two dependencies $a \to b$ and $c \to d$ in $F_c$ such that $a = c$.

A canonical cover is not unique for a given set of functional dependencies, therefore one set F can have multiple covers $F_c$.

== Algorithm for computing a canonical cover ==
1. $F_c = F$
2. Repeat:
  1. Use the union rule to replace any dependencies in $F_c$ of the form $a \to b$ and $a \to d$ with $a \to bd$.
  2. Find a functional dependency in $F_c$ with an extraneous attribute and delete it from $F_c$
3. ... until $F_c$ does not change

== Canonical cover example ==
In the following example, F_{c} is the canonical cover of F.

Given the following, we can find the canonical cover: R = (A, B, C, G, H, I), F = {A→BC, B→C, A→B, AB→C}

1. {A → BC, B → C, A → B, AB → C}
2. {A → BC, B → C, AB → C}
3. {A → BC, B → C}
4. {A → B, B →C}

F_{c} = {A → B, B → C}

== Extraneous attributes ==
An attribute is extraneous in a functional dependency if its removal from that functional dependency does not alter the closure of any attributes.

=== Extraneous determinant attributes ===
Given a set of functional dependencies $F$ and a functional dependency $A \rightarrow B$ in $F$, the attribute $a$ is extraneous in $A$ if $a \subset A$ and any of the functional dependencies in $(F-(A \rightarrow B) \cup { (A-a) \rightarrow B} )$ can be implied by $F$ using Armstrong's Axioms.

Using an alternate method, given the set of functional dependencies $F$, and a functional dependency X → A in $F$, attribute Y is extraneous in X if $Y \subseteq X$, and $(X-Y)^+ \supseteq A$.

For example:

- If F = {A → C, AB → C}, B is extraneous in AB → C because A → C can be inferred even after deleting B. This is true because if A functionally determines C, then AB also functionally determines C.
- If F = {A → D, D → C, AB → C}, B is extraneous in AB → C because {A → D, D → C, AB → C} logically implies A → C.

=== Extraneous dependent attributes ===
Given a set of functional dependencies $F$ and a functional dependency $A \rightarrow B$ in $F$, the attribute $a$ is extraneous in $A$ if $a \subset A$ and any of the functional dependencies in $(F-(A \rightarrow B) \cup \{ A \rightarrow (B-a) \} )$ can be implied by $F$ using Armstrong's axioms.

A dependent attribute of a functional dependency is extraneous if we can remove it without changing the closure of the set of determinant attributes in that functional dependency.

For example:

- If F = {A → C, AB → CD}, C is extraneous in AB → CD because AB → C can be inferred even after deleting C.
- If F = {A → BC, B → C}, C is extraneous in A → BC because A → C can be inferred even after deleting C.
