= Christopher Jermaine =

American computer scientist

Academic background
- Education: University of California, San Diego (BA); Ohio State University (MS); Georgia Tech (PhD)
- Academic advisors: Renée Miller; Ed Omiecinski

Academic work
- Discipline: Computer science
- Sub-discipline: Data analytics Database theory Data management
- Institutions: University of Florida; Rice University

Christopher M. Jermaine is an American computer scientist who is the J.S. Abercrombie Professor of Engineering and chair of the Department of Computer Science at Rice University.

== Education ==
Jermaine earned a Bachelor of Arts degree in mathematics from the University of California, San Diego, a Master of Science in computer science from Ohio State University, and a PhD in computer science from Georgia Tech. Jermaine's graduate advisor was Renée Miller.

== Career ==
From 2002 to 2010, Jermaine was on the computer science faculty of the University of Florida. He joined Rice University in 2009. Jermaine is also the editor-in-chief of ACM Transactions on Database Systems. His research focuses on data analytics, data management, and database theory.
