= Yehoshua Sagiv =

Israeli computer scientist

- יהושע סגיב
- Born: Yehoshua Chaim Sagiv
- Education: Princeton University
- Scientific career
- Fields: Computer Science
- Workplaces: Hebrew University of Jerusalem
- Doctoral advisor: Jeffrey Ullman

Yehoshua Chaim ("Shuky") Sagiv (Hebrew: יהושע סגיב) is a computer scientist and professor of computer science at the Hebrew University of Jerusalem. He obtained his PhD at Princeton University in 1978. His advisor was Jeffrey Ullman.

Sagiv is one of the founders of the field of relational database theory, and specifically of dependency theory. He also did seminal work in the areas of semi-structured databases and local-as-view data integration.

As of 2008, he is the most-published author in the ACM Symposium on Principles of Database Systems with 29 papers published there. He was also the winner of the ACM SIGMOD Test of Time Award in 2002.
