= Kristin Yvonne Rozier =

American computer scientist and aerospace engineer

Kristin Yvonne Rozier is an American aerospace engineer and computer scientist whose research investigates formal methods including temporal logic and model checking for the formal verification of safety-critical systems, especially those involving air transport, unmanned aerial vehicles, and air traffic control. She is Black & Veatch Associate Professor of Aerospace Engineering, Computer Science, Electrical and Computer Engineering, and Mathematics at Iowa State University, where she heads the Laboratory for Temporal Logic.

== Education and career ==
Rozier studied computer science at the College of William & Mary, graduating in 2000. After earning a master's degree there in 2001, supervised by Paul K. Stockmeyer, she went to Rice University for doctoral study in computer science. She completed her Ph.D. in 2012, with the dissertation Explicit or Symbolic Translation of Linear Temporal Logic to Automata. Her doctoral advisor was Moshe Vardi, with Stockmeyer as co-advisor.

She joined the NASA Langley Research Center as a research scientist in 2003, and moved to the Ames Research Center in 2008. In 2015 she became an assistant professor of aerospace engineering and engineering mechanics at the University of Cincinnati, and in 2016 she moved to her present position at Iowa State University. She was promoted to associate professor, and named Black & Veatch Associate Professor, in 2021.

She is also active in supporting women from underrepresented groups in STEM through the Jewels Academy, a non-profit organization based in Des Moines, Iowa.

== Recognition ==
In 2013, the Intelligent Systems Technical Committee of the American Institute of Aeronautics and Astronautics gave Rozier their Distinguished Service Award. In 2014, Rozier won the inaugural Initiative-Inspiration-Impact Award of Women in Aerospace, "for exemplary achievement of formal specification, verification and validation of a NextGen air traffic control system candidate and for dedication as a mentor and role model".

She won a National Science Foundation CAREER Award and a NASA Early Career Faculty Award in 2016.
