= John Holdren =

American scientist and presidential advisor

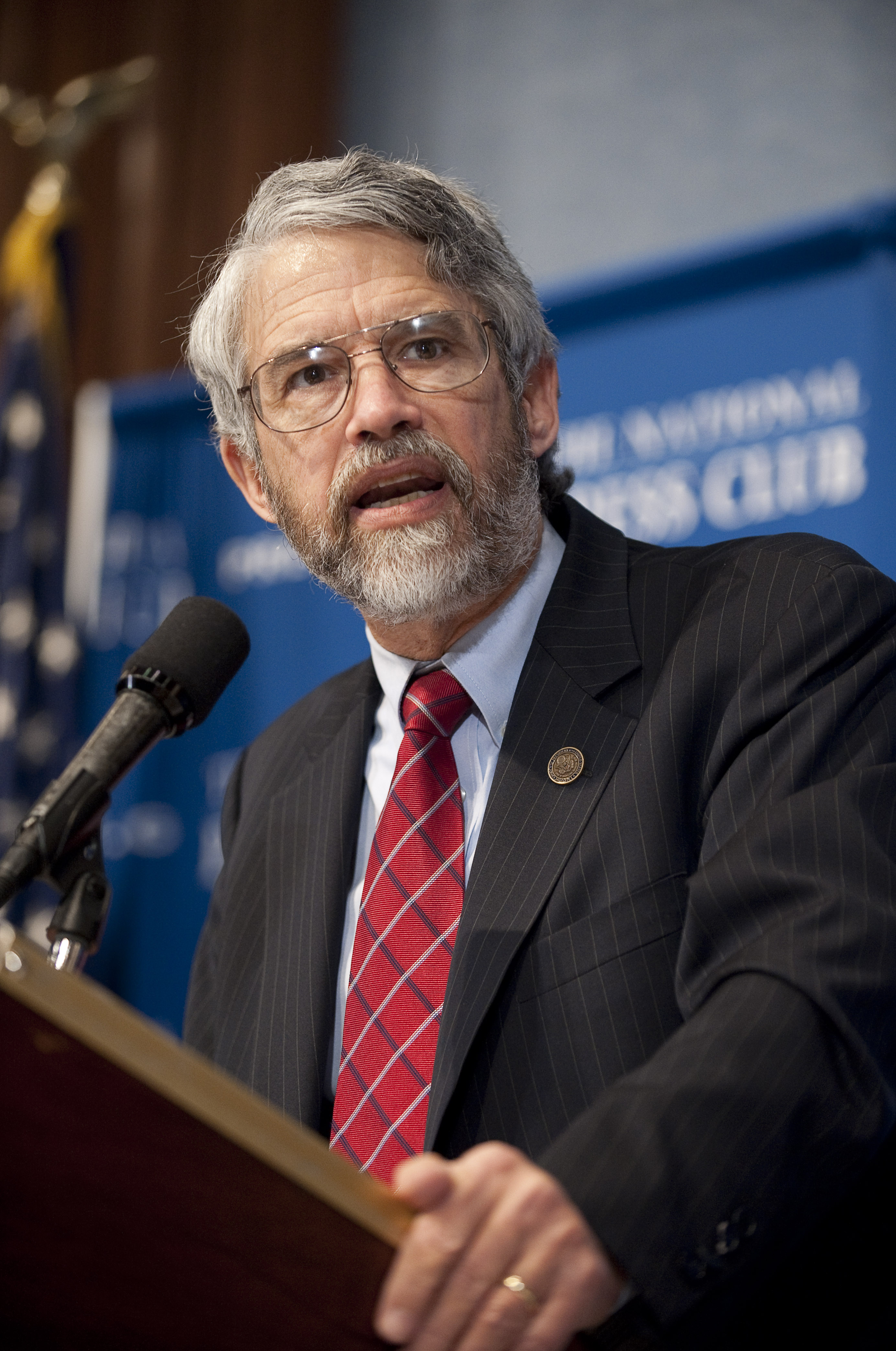

Director of the Office of Science and Technology Policy
- In office March 19, 2009 – January 20, 2017
- President: Barack Obama
- Preceded by: Ted Wackler (Acting)
- Succeeded by: Ted Wackler (Acting)

Personal details
- Born: March 1, 1944 (age 82) Sewickley, Pennsylvania, U.S.
- Party: Democratic
- Education: Massachusetts Institute of Technology (BS, MS); Stanford University (PhD)
- Awards: Public Welfare Medal (2022)
- Scientific career
- Fields: Physics, Environmental science
- Workplaces: Harvard University; University of California, Berkeley
- Thesis: Collisionless stability of an inhomogeneous, confined, planar plasma (1970)
- Doctoral advisor: Oscar Buneman
- Doctoral students: Kirk R. Smith

John Paul Holdren (born March 1, 1944) is an American scientist who served as the senior advisor to President Barack Obama on science and technology issues through his roles as assistant to the president for science and technology, director of the White House Office of Science and Technology Policy, and co-chair of the President's Council of Advisors on Science and Technology (PCAST).

Holdren was previously the Teresa and John Heinz Professor of Environmental Policy at the Kennedy School of Government at Harvard University, director of the Science, Technology, and Public Policy Program at the School's Belfer Center for Science and International Affairs, and director of the Woods Hole Research Center.

== Early life and education ==
Holdren was born in Sewickley, Pennsylvania and grew up in San Mateo, California. He trained in aeronautics, astronautics and plasma physics and earned a bachelor's degree from the Massachusetts Institute of Technology in 1965 and a Ph.D. from Stanford University in 1970 supervised by Oscar Buneman.

== Career ==
Holdren taught at Harvard for 13 years and at the University of California, Berkeley for more than two decades. His work has focused on the causes and consequences of global environmental change, population control, energy technologies and policies, ways to reduce the dangers from nuclear weapons and materials, and science and technology policy. He has also taken measures to contextualize the United States' current energy challenge, noting the role that nuclear energy could play.

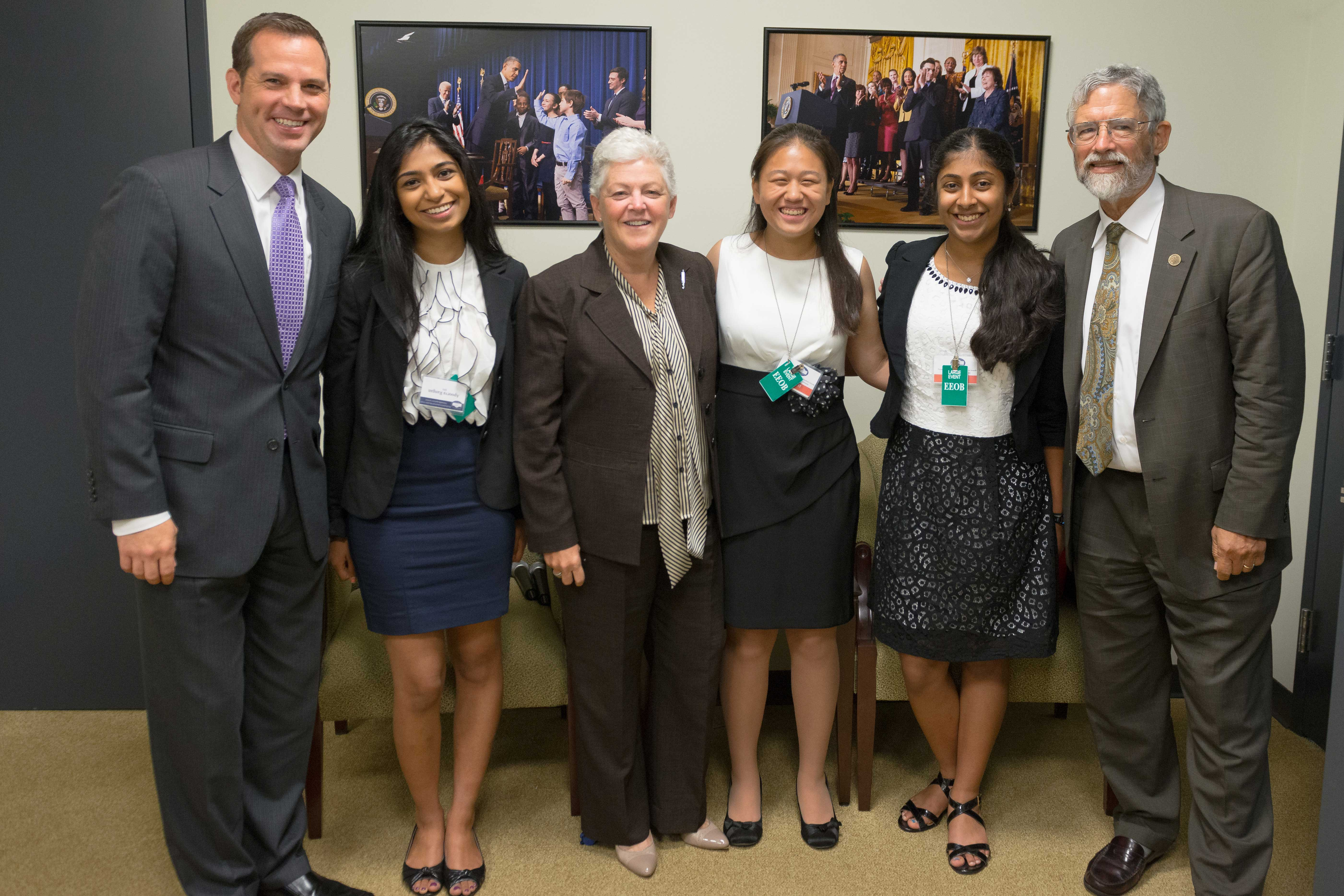
Chair of the Council on Environmental Quality Mike Boots, President's Environmental Youth Award (PEYA) winner / EPA intern Apoorva Rangan, EPA Administrator Gina McCarthy, PEYA winner May Wang, PEYA award winner Deepika Kurup, and White House Office of Science and Technology Policy Director John Holdren before the PEYA awards ceremony

Holdren was involved in the famous Simon–Ehrlich wager in 1980. He, along with two other scientists helped Paul R. Ehrlich establish the bet with Julian Simon, in which they bet that the price of five key metals would be higher in 1990. The bet was centered around a disagreement concerning the future scarcity of resources in an increasingly polluted and heavily populated world. Ehrlich and Holdren lost the bet, when the price of metals had decreased by 1990.

In 1981, Holdren was awarded a MacArthur Fellowship (informally known as the "genius award") for his efforts to promote world peace through energy management.

Holdren was chair of the Executive Committee of the Pugwash Conferences on Science and World Affairs from 1987 until 1997 and delivered the Nobel Peace Prize acceptance lecture on behalf of Pugwash Conferences in December 1995. From 1993 until 2003, he was chair of the Committee on International Security and Arms Control of the National Academy of Sciences, and co-chairman of the bipartisan National Committee on Energy Policy from 2002 until 2007. Holdren was elected President of the American Association for the Advancement of Science (AAAS) (2006–2007), and served as board Chairman (2007–2008). He was the founding chair of the advisory board for Innovations, a quarterly journal about entrepreneurial solutions to global challenges published by MIT Press, and has written and lectured extensively on the topic of global warming.

Holdren was elected a member of the National Academy of Engineering (2000) for articulation of energy environmental and proliferation issues.

Holdren served as one of President Bill Clinton's science advisors (PCAST) from 1994 to 2001. Eight years later, President Barack Obama nominated Holdren for the position of science advisor and director of the Office of Science and Technology Policy in December 2008, and he was confirmed on March 19, 2009, by a unanimous vote in the Senate. He testified to the nomination committee that he does not believe that government should have a role in determining optimal population size and that he never endorsed forced sterilization.

=== Writings ===
Overpopulation was an early concern and interest. In a 1969 article, Holdren and co-author Paul R. Ehrlich argued, "if the population control measures are not initiated immediately, and effectively, all the technology man can bring to bear will not fend off the misery to come." In 1973, Holdren encouraged a decline in fertility to well below replacement in the United States, because "210 million now is too many and 280 million in 2040 is likely to be much too many." (The population of the US was 327.2 million in 2018.) In 1977, Paul R. Ehrlich, Anne H. Ehrlich, and Holdren co-authored the textbook Ecoscience: Population, Resources, Environment. Other early publications include Energy (1971), Human Ecology (1973), Energy in Transition (1980), Earth and the Human Future (1986), Strategic Defenses and the Future of the Arms Race (1987), Building Global Security Through Cooperation (1990), and Conversion of Military R&D (1998).

Holdren also authored over 200 articles and papers and has co-authored and co-edited some 20 books and book-length reports including:

- Science in the White House. Science, May 2009, 567.
- Policy for Energy Technology Innovation. Acting in Time on Energy Policy, (with Laura Diaz Anadon, Max H. Bazerman, David T. Ellwood, Kelly Sims Gallagher, William H. Hogan, Henry Lee, and Daniel Schrag), Brookings Institution Press, 2009.
- The Future of Climate Change Policy: The U.S.'s Last Chance to Lead. Scientific American 2008 Earth 3.0 Supplement. October 13, 2008, 20–21.
- Convincing the Climate Change Skeptics. The Boston Globe, August 4, 2008.
- Ending the Energy Stalemate: A Bipartisan Strategy To Meet America's Energy Challenges. Presentation at the National Academies 2008 Energy Summit, Washington, D.C., March 14, 2008.
- Global Climatic Disruption: Risks and Opportunities. Presentation at Investor Summit on Climate Risk, New York, February 14, 2008.
- Meeting the Climate-Change Challenge. The John H. Chafee Memorial Lecture, National Council for Science and the Environment, Washington, D.C., January 17, 2008.

== Personal life ==
Holdren lives in Falmouth, Massachusetts, with his wife, biologist Cheryl E. Holdren (formerly Cheryl Lea Edgar), with whom he has two children and five grandchildren.

== Affiliations and awards ==
- MacArthur Fellow (1981)
- Fellow of the American Academy of Arts and Sciences (1983)
- Fellow of the American Physical Society (1988)
- Member of the National Academy of Sciences (1991)
- Volvo Environment Prize (1993 with Paul Ehrlich)
- Kaul Foundation Award in Science and Environmental Policy (1999)
- Member of the National Academy of Engineering (2000)
- Tyler Prize for Environmental Achievement (2000)
- 7th Annual Heinz Award in Public Policy (2001)
- Member of the American Philosophical Society (2015)
- Lawrence S. Huntington Environmental Prize (2017)
- Moynihan Prize (2018)
- Public Welfare Medal from National Academy of Sciences

Political offices
Preceded by Ted Wackler; Acting	Director of the Office of Science and Technology Policy; 2009–2017	Succeeded by Ted Wackler; Acting
