= Wang-Chiew Tan =

Singaporean computer scientist

- Education: University of Pennsylvania
- Known for: data lineage and data integration
- Awards: ACM Fellow
- Scientific career
- Fields: Computer Science
- Workplaces: Megagon Labs
- Doctoral advisor: Peter Buneman and Sanjeev Khanna
- Website: wangchiew.github.io

Wang-Chiew Tan is a Singaporean computer scientist specializing in data management and natural language processing. Her work in data management includes data provenance (or data lineage) and data integration. She is currently a Research Scientist at Facebook AI, and was previously the Director of Research at Megagon Labs in Mountain View, California.

At Megagon Labs, Tan was the lead researcher on a study with the University of Tokyo that concluded that the company of other people is more effective than pets at making people happy.

== Education and career ==
Tan earned her bachelor's degree in computer science (first-class) at the National University of Singapore, and completed her Ph.D. at the University of Pennsylvania. Her 2002 dissertation, Data Annotations, Provenance, and Archiving, was jointly supervised by Peter Buneman and Sanjeev Khanna.

Before working at Megagon, she has been a professor of computer science at the University of California, Santa Cruz beginning in 2002, and, from 2010 to 2012, was on leave from Santa Cruz as a researcher at IBM Research - Almaden.

== Recognition ==
Tan was named a Fellow of the Association for Computing Machinery in 2015 "for contributions to data provenance and to the foundations of information integration".
