= Functional dependency =

Relational database theory concept

In relational database theory, a functional dependency (FD) is constraint between two attribute sets, whereby values in one set (the determinant set) determine the values of the other set (the dependent set). A functional dependency between a determinant set X and a dependent set Y can be described as follows:

Given a relation R and attribute sets X,Y $\subseteq$ R, then X is said to functionally determine Y (written X → Y) if each X value is associated with precisely one Y value. R is then said to satisfy the functional dependency X → Y. Equivalently, the projection $\Pi_{X,Y}R$ is a function, that is, Y is a function of X.

In other words:

- when X attributes have known values (here, x), the values for their corresponding Y attributes can be determined by looking them up in any tuple of R containing x.
- two tuples sharing the same values of X will necessarily have the same values of Y.

A dependency FD: X → Y means that the values of Y are determined by the values of X. A functional dependency FD: X → Y is called trivial if Y is a subset of X.

The determination of functional dependencies is an important part of designing databases in the relational model, and in database normalization and denormalization. A simple application of functional dependencies is Heath's theorem; it says that a relation R over an attribute set U and satisfying a functional dependency X → Y can be safely split in two relations having the lossless-join decomposition property, namely into $\Pi_{XY}(R)\bowtie\Pi_{XZ}(R) = R$ where Z = U − XY are the rest of the attributes. (Unions of attribute sets are customarily denoted by their juxtapositions in database theory.) An important notion in this context is a candidate key, defined as a minimal set of attributes that functionally determine all of the attributes in a relation. The functional dependencies, along with the attribute domains, are selected so as to generate constraints that would exclude as much data inappropriate to the user domain from the system as possible.

A notion of logical implication is defined for functional dependencies in the following way: a set of functional dependencies $\Sigma$ logically implies another set of dependencies $\Gamma$, if any relation R satisfying all dependencies from $\Sigma$ also satisfies all dependencies from $\Gamma$; this is usually written $\Sigma \models \Gamma$. The notion of logical implication for functional dependencies admits a sound and complete finite axiomatization, known as Armstrong's axioms.

== Examples ==
=== Cars ===
Suppose one is designing a system to track vehicles and the capacity of their engines. Each vehicle has a unique vehicle identification number (VIN). One would write VIN → EngineCapacity because it would be inappropriate for a vehicle's engine to have more than one capacity. (Assuming, in this case, that vehicles only have one engine.) On the other hand, EngineCapacity → VIN is incorrect because there could be many vehicles with the same engine capacity.

This functional dependency may suggest that the attribute EngineCapacity be placed in a relation with candidate key VIN. However, that may not always be appropriate. For example, if that functional dependency occurs as a result of the transitive functional dependencies VIN → VehicleModel and VehicleModel → EngineCapacity then that would not result in a normalized relation.

=== Lectures ===
This example illustrates the concept of functional dependency. The situation modelled is that of college students visiting one or more lectures in each of which they are assigned a teaching assistant (TA). Let's further assume that every student is in some semester and is identified by a unique integer ID.

Student ID	Semester	Lecture	TA
1234	6	Numerical Methods	John
1221	4	Numerical Methods	Smith
1234	6	Visual Computing	Bob
1201	2	Numerical Methods	Peter
1201	2	Physics II	Simon

We notice that whenever two rows in this table feature the same StudentID, they also necessarily have the same Semester values. This basic fact can be expressed by a functional dependency:

- StudentID → Semester.

If a row was added where the student had a different value of semester, then the functional dependency FD would no longer exist. This means that the FD is implied by the data as it is possible to have values that would invalidate the FD.

Other nontrivial functional dependencies can be identified, for example:

- {StudentID, Lecture} → TA
- {StudentID, Lecture} → {TA, Semester}

The latter expresses the fact that the set {StudentID, Lecture} is a superkey of the relation.

=== Employee department ===
A classic example of functional dependency is the employee department model.

Employee ID	Employee name	Department ID	Department name
0001	John Doe	1	Human Resources
0002	Jane Doe	2	Marketing
0003	John Smith	1	Human Resources
0004	Jane Goodall	3	Sales

This case represents an example where multiple functional dependencies are embedded in a single representation of data. Note that because an employee can only be a member of one department, the unique ID of that employee determines the department.

- Employee ID → Employee Name
- Employee ID → Department ID

In addition to this relationship, the table also has a functional dependency through a non-key attribute

- Department ID → Department Name

This example demonstrates that even though there exists a FD Employee ID → Department ID - the employee ID would not be a logical key for determination of the department Name. The process of normalization of the data would recognize all FDs and allow the designer to construct tables and relationships that are more logical based on the data.

== Properties and axiomatization of functional dependencies ==
Given that X, Y, and Z are sets of attributes in a relation R, one can derive several properties of functional dependencies. Among the most important are the following, usually called Armstrong's axioms:

- Reflexivity: If Y is a subset of X, then X → Y
- Augmentation: If X → Y, then XZ → YZ
- Transitivity: If X → Y and Y → Z, then X → Z

"Reflexivity" can be weakened to just $X \rightarrow \varnothing$, i.e. it is an actual axiom, where the other two are proper inference rules, more precisely giving rise to the following rules of syntactic consequence:

$\vdash X \rightarrow \varnothing$
$X \rightarrow Y \vdash XZ \rightarrow YZ$
$X \rightarrow Y, Y \rightarrow Z \vdash X \rightarrow Z$.

These three rules are a sound and complete axiomatization of functional dependencies. This axiomatization is sometimes described as finite because the number of inference rules is finite, with the caveat that the axiom and rules of inference are all schemata, meaning that the X, Y and Z range over all ground terms (attribute sets).

By applying augmentation and transitivity, one can derive two additional rules:

- Pseudotransitivity: If X → Y and YW → Z, then XW → Z
- Composition: If X → Y and Z → W, then XZ → YW

One can also derive the union and decomposition rules from Armstrong's axioms:

X → Y and X → Z if and only if X → YZ

== Closure ==
=== Closure of functional dependency ===
The closure of a set of values is the set of attributes that can be determined using its functional dependencies for a given relationship. One uses Armstrong's axioms to provide a proof - i.e. reflexivity, augmentation, transitivity.

Given $R$ and $F$ a set of FDs that holds in $R$: The closure of $F$ in $R$ (denoted $F$^{+}) is the set of all FDs that are logically implied by $F$.

=== Closure of a set of attributes ===
Closure of a set of attributes X with respect to $F$ is the set X^{+} of all attributes that are functionally determined by X using $F$^{+}.

==== Example ====
Imagine the following list of FDs. We are going to calculate a closure for A (written as A^{+}) from this relationship.

1. A → B
2. B → C
3. AB → D

The closure would be as follows:

1. A → A (by Armstrong's reflexivity)
2. A → AB (by 1. and (a))
3. A → ABD (by (b), 3, and Armstrong's transitivity)
4. A → ABCD (by (c), and 2)

Therefore, A^{+}= ABCD. Because A^{+} includes every attribute in the relationship, it is a superkey.

== Covers and equivalence ==
=== Covers ===
Definition: $F$ covers $G$ if every FD in $G$ can be inferred from $F$. $F$ covers $G$ if $G$^{+} ⊆ $F$^{+}
Every set of functional dependencies has a canonical cover.

=== Equivalence of two sets of FDs ===
Two sets of FDs $F$ and $G$ over schema $R$ are equivalent, written $F$ ≡ $G$, if $F$^{+} = $G$^{+}. If $F$ ≡ $G$, then $F$ is a cover for $G$ and vice versa. In other words, equivalent sets of functional dependencies are called covers of each other.

=== Non-redundant covers ===
A set $F$ of FDs is nonredundant if there is no proper subset $F'$ of $F$ with $F'$ ≡ $F$. If such an $F'$ exists, $F$ is redundant. $F$ is a nonredundant cover for $G$ if $F$ is a cover for $G$ and $F$ is nonredundant.
An alternative characterization of nonredundancy is that $F$ is nonredundant if there is no FD X → Y in $F$ such that $F$ - {X → Y} $\models$ X → Y. Call an FD X → Y in $F$ redundant in $F$ if $F$ - {X → Y} $\models$ X → Y.

== Applications to normalization ==
=== Heath's theorem ===
An important property (yielding an immediate application) of functional dependencies is that if R is a relation with columns named from some set of attributes U and R satisfies some functional dependency X → Y then $R=\Pi_{XY}(R)\bowtie\Pi_{XZ}(R)$ where Z = U − XY. Intuitively, if a functional dependency X → Y holds in R, then the relation can be safely split in two relations alongside the column X (which is a key for $\Pi_{XY}(R)\bowtie\Pi_{XZ}(R)$) ensuring that when the two parts are joined back no data is lost, i.e. a functional dependency provides a simple way to construct a lossless join decomposition of R in two smaller relations. This fact is sometimes called Heaths theorem; it is one of the early results in database theory.

Heath's theorem effectively says we can pull out the values of Y from the big relation R and store them into one, $\Pi_{XY}(R)$, which has no value repetitions in the row for X and is effectively a lookup table for Y keyed by X and consequently has only one place to update the Y corresponding to each X unlike the "big" relation R where there are potentially many copies of each X, each one with its copy of Y which need to be kept synchronized on updates. (This elimination of redundancy is an advantage in OLTP contexts, where many changes are expected, but not so much in OLAP contexts, which involve mostly queries.) Heath's decomposition leaves only X to act as a foreign key in the remainder of the big table $\Pi_{XZ}(R)$.

Functional dependencies however should not be confused with inclusion dependencies, which are the formalism for foreign keys; even though they are used for normalization, functional dependencies express constraints over one relation (schema), whereas inclusion dependencies express constraints between relation schemas in a database schema. Furthermore, the two notions do not even intersect in the classification of dependencies: functional dependencies are equality-generating dependencies whereas inclusion dependencies are tuple-generating dependencies. Enforcing referential constraints after relation schema decomposition (normalization) requires a new formalism, i.e. inclusion dependencies. In the decomposition resulting from Heath's theorem, there is nothing preventing the insertion of tuples in $\Pi_{XZ}(R)$ having some value of X not found in $\Pi_{XY}(R)$.

=== Normal forms ===
Normal forms are database normalization levels which determine the "goodness" of a table. Generally, the third normal form is considered to be a "good" standard for a relational database.

Normalization aims to free the database from update, insertion and deletion anomalies. It also ensures that when a new value is introduced into the relation, it has minimal effect on the database, and thus minimal effect on the applications using the database.

== Irreducible function depending set ==
A set S of functional dependencies is irreducible if the set has the following three properties:

1. Each right set of a functional dependency of S contains only one attribute.
2. Each left set of a functional dependency of S is irreducible. It means that reducing any one attribute from left set will change the content of S (S will lose some information).
3. Reducing any functional dependency will change the content of S.

Sets of functional dependencies with these properties are also called canonical or minimal. Finding such a set S of functional dependencies which is equivalent to some input set S' provided as input is called finding a minimal cover of S': this problem can be solved in polynomial time.

== See also ==
- Chase (algorithm)
- Inclusion dependency
- Join dependency
- Multivalued dependency (MVD)
- Database normalization
- First normal form
