= William Ward Armstrong =

Canadian mathematician and computer scientist

William Ward Armstrong is a Canadian mathematician and computer scientist. He earned his Ph.D. from the University of British Columbia in 1966 and is most known as the originator Armstrong's axioms of dependency in a Relational database.

== Works ==
- William W. Armstrong, Yatsuka Nakamura, Piotr Rudnicki, "Armstrong's Axioms", Formalized Mathematics V. 11 No. 1, pp. 39 – 51, University of Bialystok, 2003.
- Guoliang Qu, John R. Feddes, Richard N. Coleman, William W. Armstrong, Jerry L. Leonard, Method and Apparatus for estimating odor concentration using an electronic nose, US patent 6,411,905 B1, June 25, 2002.
- W. W. Armstrong, D. O. Gorodnichy, Breaking Hyperplanes to fit Data with Applications to 3D World Modeling and Oil Sand Data Analysis, Proc. ICSC Symposium on Neural Computation, CD-ROM, publ. by ICSC Academic Press, Int'l Comp. Sci. Conv., Canada/Switzerland ISBN 3-906454-21-5, Berlin, 2000,.
- Dmitry O. Gorodnichy, W. W. Armstrong, Neurocomputational Approach for Modeling Large Scale Environments from Range Data, ibid.
- W.W. Armstrong, B. Coghlan, D.O. Gorodnichy, Reinforcement learning for autonomous robot navigation, Proc. Int'l Joint Conf. on Neural Networks (IJCNN'99), Washington DC, July 21–23, 1999.
- D.O. Gorodnichy, W.W. Armstrong, Single Camera Stereo for Mobile Robots, Vision Interface (VI'99)Conference proceedings, Quebec, May 18–21, 1999.
- D.O. Gorodnichy, W.W. Armstrong, A Parametrical Alternative for Grids in Occupancy Based World Modeling, Proc. Quality Control by Artificial Vision Conference (QCAV'99), Trois Rivieres, 125-132, 1999.
- Dmitry O. Gorodnichy, William Ward Armstrong, X. Li, Adaptive logic networks for facial feature detection, Lecture Notes in Computer Science Vol. 1311, Proceedings of the 9th International Conference on Image Analysis and Processing-Volume II, ISBN 3-540-63508-4, 1997.
- William W. Armstrong, Hardware requirements for fast evaluation of functions learned by adaptive logic networks, Proc. 1st Int'l Conf. ICES '96, Tsukuba, Evolvable Systems: From Biology to Hardware, ISBN 3-540-63173-9, 17-22, Springer, 1996
- Mark J. Polak, Sophia Zhou, Pentti M. Rautaharju, William W. Armstrong, Bernard R. Chaitman, Adaptive Logic Network Compared with Backpropagation Network in Automated Detection of Ischemia From Resting ECG, Computers in Cardiology, 217-220, 1995.
- Aleksandar Kostov, Brian J. Andrews, Dejan B.Popovic, Richard B. Stein, William W. Armstrong, Machine Learning in Control of Functional Electrical Stimulation Systems for Locomotion, IEEE Trans. on Biomedical Engineering, V. 42, No. 6, 541-551, 1995.
- Aleksandar Kostov, Brian Andrews, Richard B. Stein, Dejan Popovic, William W. Armstrong, Machine Learning in Control of Functional Electrical Stimulation for Locomotion, 16th Int'l Conf. on Engineering in Biology and Medicine, Baltimore MD, 418-419, 1994.
- Aleksandar Kostov, Richard B. Stein, Dejan Popovic, William W. Armstrong, Improved methods for control of FES for locomotion, Conf. on Modeling and Control in Biomedical Systems, Galveston TX, 422-427, 1994.
- Aleksandar Kostov, Richard B. Stein, Dejan Popovic, William W. Armstrong, Use of afferent recordings in prediction of EMG muscle activity of the same limb by artificial neural networks, Physiology Canada, V. 24, No. 3, 162, 1993.
- W. W. Armstrong, R. B. Stein, A. Kostov, M. Thomas, P. Baudin, P. Gervais, D. Popovic, Application of Adaptive Logic Networks, to Study and Control of Human Movement, 2nd. Int'l Symposium of 3D Analysis of Human Movement, Poitiers, France, June 30-July 3, 81-84, 1993.
- Aleksandar Kostov, Dejan Popovic, Richard B. Stein, William W. Armstrong, Learning of EMG patterns by Adaptive Logic Networks, 15th Int'l Conf. on Engineering in Biology and Medicine, San Diego, 1135-1136, 1993.
- D. Popovic, R. B. Stein, K. Jovanovic, R. Dai, A. Kostov, W. W. Armstrong, "Sensory Nerve Recording for Closed-Loop Control to Restore Motor Functions, IEEE Trans. on Biomedical Engineering, V. 40, No. 10, 1024-1031, 1993.
- J. P. Baudin, P. Gervais, W. W. Armstrong, The use of a recursive solution for dynamic simulation of human motion, 4th Int'l Symposium on Computer Simulation in Biomechanics, Paris, BML1 2-5, 1993.
- Allen G. Supynuk, William W. Armstrong, Adaptive Logic Networks and Robot Control, Vision Interface '92, Vancouver BC, 181-186, 1992.
- William W. Armstrong, Andrew Dwelly, Jian Dong Liang, Dekang Lin, Scott Reynolds, Learning and Generalization in Adaptive Logic Networks, Artificial Neural Networks 1173-1176, Elsevier 1991.
- Ahmed S. Mohamed, William W. Armstrong, Towards a computational theory for motion understanding: the expert animators model, 4th NASA Conf. on Artificial Intelligence for Space Applications, Huntsville, 289-302, 1988.
- Ahmed S. Mohamed, William W. Armstrong, Measuring Learning Progress in Intelligent Autonomous Robots, Journal of Robotic Systems W. 5, No. 6 583-607, 1988.
- William W. Armstrong, T. Anthony Marsland, Marius Olafsson and Jonathan Schaeffer. Solving Equations of Motion on a Virtual Tree Machine, SIAM Journal of Scientific and Statistical Computing, Vol. 8, No. 1, s59-s72, 1987.
- William W. Armstrong, Mark W. Green, Robert Lake, "Near-Real-Time Control of Human Figure Models" IEEE Computer Graphics and Applications V. 7 No. 6, 52-61, 1987.
- W. W. Armstrong, A. S. Mohamed, A mixed-flow query processing strategy for a multiprocessor database machine, 5th Int'l Conf. on Distributed Computing Systems, Denver, 292 - 299, IEEE CS, 1985.
- William W. Armstrong, Mark W. Green, The dynamics of articulated rigid bodies for purposes of animation, The Visual Computer, 1, 231-240, Springer-Verlag, 1985.
- William Ward Armstrong, Claude Delobel, Decompositions and Functional Dependencies in Relations. ACM Trans. on Database Systems V. 5, No. 4, 404-429, 1980.
- W. W. Armstrong, Recursive Solution to the Equations of Motion of an N-link Manipulator, Proc. 5th World Congress on Theory of Machines and Mechanisms, 1343-1346, ASME 1979.
- W. W. Armstrong, Jan Gecsei, Architecture of a Tree-Based Image Processor, 12th Asilomar Conf. on Circuits, Systems and Computers, 345-349, IEEE Computer Soc., 1978.
- William W. Armstrong, Jan Gecsei, Adaptation Algorithms for Binary Tree Networks, IEEE Trans. on Systems, Man and Cybernetics, V. SMC-9, No. 5, 276-285, 1979.
- William W. Armstrong, Adaptive Boolean Logic Element, US Patent 3,934,231, Jan. 20, 1976.
- William Ward Armstrong. "Dependency structures of data base relationships". In Jack L. Rosenfeld and Herbert Freeman, editors, Proceedings of IFIP Congress 74, 580-583, North Holland, 1974.
- G. V. Bochmann, W. W. Armstrong, Properties of Boolean Functions with a Tree Decomposition, BIT, V. 1, No. 13, 1-13, 1974.
- William W. Armstrong, Trainable Digital Apparatus, US. Patent 3,613,084, October 12, 1971.
- W. W. Armstrong, Convergence Radius of Regularly Monotonic Functions, Duke Mathematical Journal, V. 37, No. 1, 41-48, 1970.
- William W. Armstrong, Curves on Surfaces of Constant Width, Canad. Math. Bulletin V. 9, No. 1, 15-21, 1966.
