= Oscar Buneman =

- Born: 28 September 1913
- Died: 24 January 1993 (aged 79)
- Education: University of Manchester
- Children: Peter Buneman
- Scientific career
- Workplaces: Stanford University
- Doctoral advisor: Douglas Hartree
- Doctoral students: John Holdren

Oscar Buneman (28 September 1913 – 24 January 1993) made advances in science, engineering, and mathematics. Buneman was a pioneer of computational plasma physics and plasma simulation.

== Career ==
In 1940 upon completion of his PhD with Douglas Hartree, Buneman joined Hartree's magnetron research group assisting the development of radar during World War II. They discovered the Buneman–Hartree criterion for the voltage threshold of a magnetron operation. After the war, Buneman developed theories and simulations of collision-less dissipation of currents called the Buneman instability. This is an example of anomalous resistivity or absorption. It is anomalous because the phenomenon does not depend on collisions. Buneman advanced elliptic equation solver methods and their associated applications (as well as for the fast Fourier transforms).

== Personal life ==
On 24 January 1993 Oscar Buneman at the age of 79 died near Stanford University. The computer scientist Peter Buneman is his son.

== Publications ==
- Buneman, O., "Time reversible difference procedures". Journal of Computers Physics. 1, 517 (1967).
- Buneman, O., "A compact non-iterative poisson-solver". SUIPR report 294, Stanford University (1969).
- Buneman, O., "Fast numerical procedures for computer experiments on relativistic plasmas, in "Relativistic Plasmas (The Coral Gables Conference)", Benjamin, NY, 1968.
- Buneman, O. (1973). "Subgrid resolution of flow and force fields". Journal of Computational Physics. 11 (2): 250–268. doi:10.1016/0021-9991(73)90006-5.
- Buneman, O., and et al., "Principles and capabilities of 3d EM particle simulations". Journal of Computational Physics. 38, 1 (1980).

== External links and resources ==
- Langdon, Bruce, "Remembrances of Oscar Buneman ". ICNSP'98.
- Oscar Buneman Papers
- Rita Meyer-Spasche/Rolf Tomas Nossum: Persecution and Patronage: Oscar Buneman's years in Britain. In: Almagest, International Journal for the History of Scientific Ideas, Vol. 7, Issue 2, 2016
