= Sanjeev Khanna =

Indian-American computer scientist

- Born: New Delhi, India
- Citizenship: United States
- Education: Birla Institute of Technology and Science, Pilani University of Illinois at Urbana-Champaign Stanford University
- Spouse: Delphine Khanna
- Scientific career
- Fields: Theoretical computer science
- Thesis: A Structural View of Approximation (1996)
- Doctoral advisor: Rajeev Motwani
- Doctoral students: Wang-Chiew Tan

Sanjeev Khanna is an Indian-American computer scientist. He is currently a professor of Computer Science at New York University. His research interests include approximation algorithms, hardness of approximation, combinatorial optimization, and sublinear algorithms.

== Career ==
Khanna received his undergraduate degrees in computer science and economics from Birla Institute of Technology and Science, Pilani, India in 1990, his M.S. degree in computer science from University of Illinois at Urbana-Champaign in 1992, and his doctoral degree in computer science from Stanford University, California, US in 1996. He joined University of Pennsylvania in 1999 after spending three years as a member of the Mathematical Sciences Research center at Bell Laboratories. In 2026, he joined New York University.

== Research contribution and awards ==
Khanna's primary research contributions are to the fields of approximation algorithms, hardness of approximation, combinatorial optimization, and sublinear algorithms. His doctoral work at Stanford University, "A Structural View of Approximation", received the 1996 Arthur Samuel prize for the best PhD dissertation in the Computer Science Department. He is a Guggenheim Fellow (2007) and a Sloan Fellow (2000). He is also a recipient of S. Reid Warren, Jr. and Lindback awards for distinguished teaching at University of Pennsylvania.

He serves on the Editorial board of Foundations and Trends in Theoretical Computer Science, and has previously served on the editorial boards of SICOMP, ACM TALG, Algorithmica, JCSS, and as an area editor for Encyclopaedia of Algorithms.

In 2018, the Association for Computing Machinery named him an ACM Fellow for his contributions to approximation algorithms, hardness of approximation, and sublinear algorithms.
