= ACM Transactions on Database Systems =

- Discipline: Database management system
- Language: English
- Edited by: Christopher Jermaine

Publication details
- History: 1976–present
- Publisher: ACM (United States)
- Frequency: Quarterly
- Open access: Hybrid
- Impact factor: 1.086 (2020)

Standard abbreviations
- ISO 4: ACM Trans. Database Syst.

Indexing
- ISSN: 0362-5915 (print); 1557-4644 (web)

Links
- Journal homepage; Online access; Online archive

The ACM Transactions on Database Systems (ACM TODS) is one of the journals produced by the Association for Computing Machinery. TODS publishes one volume yearly. Each volume has four issues, which appear in March, June, September and December. The editor-in-chief is Christopher Jermaine (Rice University).

== Abstracting and indexing ==
According to the Journal Citation Reports, the journal had a 2020 impact factor of 1.086.

It is indexed in the following bibliographic databases:

- Ei Compendex
- SCImago
- Scopus
- ProQuest SciTech Premium Collection
- Web of Science
