= International Conference on Database Theory =

- Abbreviation: ICDT
- Discipline: Database theory

Publication details
- Publisher: LIPIcs
- History: 1986–present
- Frequency: Annual
- Open access: yes
- Website: https://databasetheory.org/icdt-pages

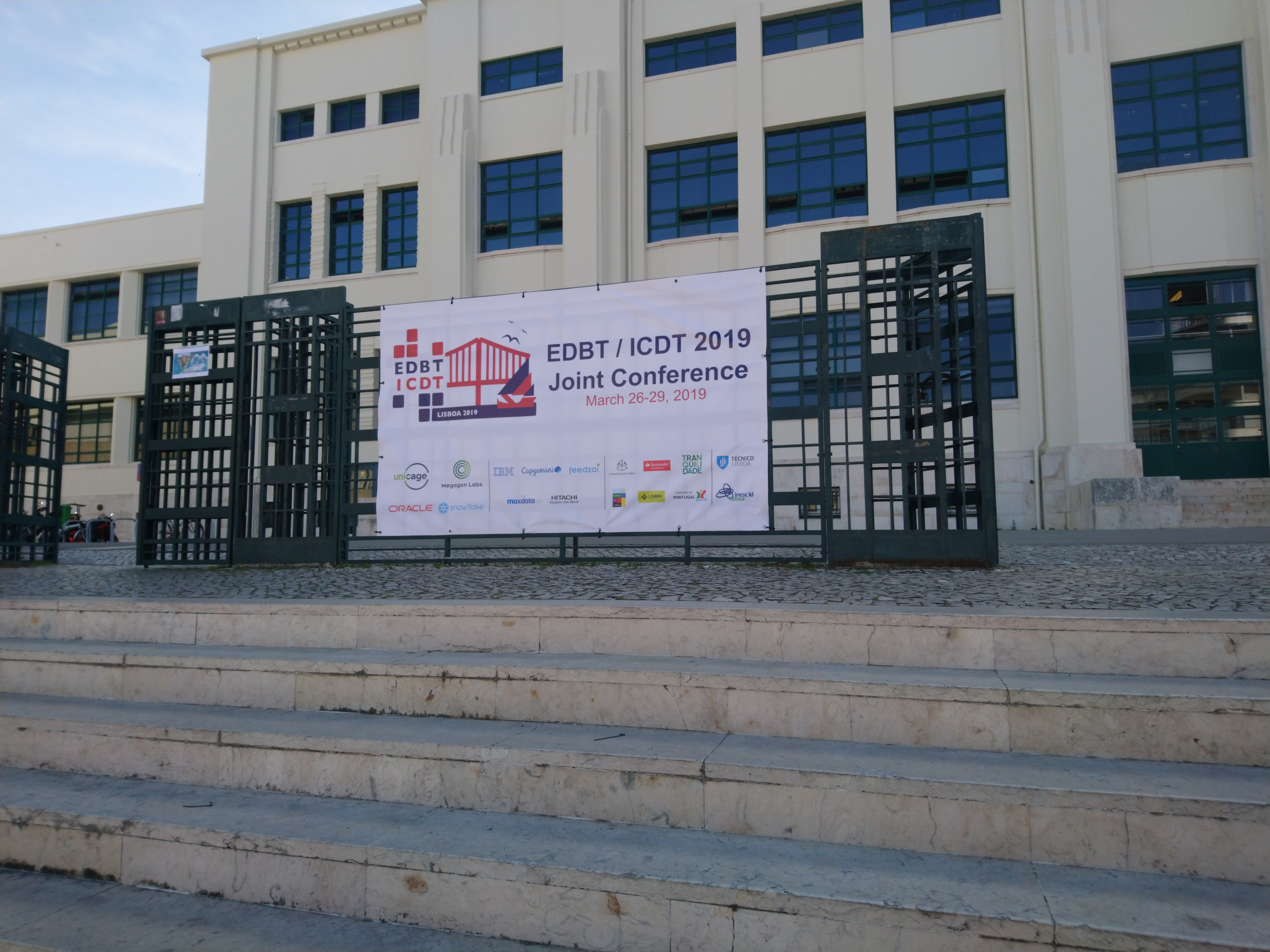
EDBT/ICDT 2019 in Lisbon

The International Conference on Database Theory (ICDT) is an international research conference on foundations of database theory, and has been held since 1986. It is frequently also called the PODS of Europe. Since 2009, ICDT has been held jointly with the EDBT, a research conference on systems aspects of data management. Until 2009, the conference used to happen biennially. The conference now happens annually at a location typically within Europe. ICDT is relevant to the European database theory research community. It continually receives an A-ranking from the CORE conference ranking system.
