= Armstrong's axioms =

Inference rules in database theory

Armstrong's axioms are a set of axioms (or, more precisely, inference rules) used to infer all the functional dependencies on a relational database. They were developed by William W. Armstrong in his 1974 paper. The axioms are sound in generating only functional dependencies in the closure of a set of functional dependencies (denoted as $F^{+}$) when applied to that set (denoted as $F$). They are also complete in that repeated application of these rules will generate all functional dependencies in the closure $F^+$.

More formally, let $\langle R(U), F \rangle$ denote a relational scheme over the set of attributes $U$ with a set of functional dependencies $F$. We say that a functional dependency $f$ is logically implied by $F$, and denote it with $F \models f$ if and only if for every instance $r$ of $R$ that satisfies the functional dependencies in $F$, $r$ also satisfies $f$. We denote by $F^{+}$ the set of all functional dependencies that are logically implied by $F$.

Furthermore, with respect to a set of inference rules $A$, we say that a functional dependency $f$ is derivable from the functional dependencies in $F$ by the set of inference rules $A$, and we denote it by $F \vdash _{A} f$ if and only if $f$ is obtainable by means of repeatedly applying the inference rules in $A$ to functional dependencies in $F$. We denote by $F^{*}_{A}$ the set of all functional dependencies that are derivable from $F$ by inference rules in $A$.

Then, a set of inference rules $A$ is sound if and only if the following holds:

$F^{*}_{A} \subseteq F^{+}$

that is to say, we cannot derive by means of $A$ functional dependencies that are not logically implied by $F$. The set of inference rules $A$ is said to be complete if the following holds:

$F^{+} \subseteq F^{*}_{A}$

more simply put, we are able to derive by $A$ all the functional dependencies that are logically implied by $F$.

== Axioms (primary rules) ==
Let $R(U)$ be a relation scheme over the set of attributes $U$. Henceforth we will denote by letters $X$, $Y$, $Z$ any subset of $U$ and, for short, the union of two sets of attributes $X$ and $Y$ by $XY$ instead of the usual $X \cup Y$; this notation is rather standard in database theory when dealing with sets of attributes.

=== Axiom of reflexivity ===
If $X$ is a set of attributes and $Y$ is a subset of $X$, then $X$ holds $Y$. Hereby, $X$ holds $Y$ [$X \to Y$] means that $X$ functionally determines $Y$.

If $Y \subseteq X$ then $X \to Y$.

=== Axiom of augmentation ===
If $X$ holds $Y$ and $Z$ is a set of attributes, then $X Z$ holds $Y Z$. It means that attribute in dependencies does not change the basic dependencies.

If $X \to Y$, then $X Z \to Y Z$ for any $Z$.

=== Axiom of transitivity ===
If $X$ holds $Y$ and $Y$ holds $Z$, then $X$ holds $Z$.

If $X \to Y$ and $Y \to Z$, then $X \to Z$.

== Additional rules (Secondary Rules) ==
These rules can be derived from the above axioms.

=== Decomposition ===
If $X \to Y Z$ then $X \to Y$ and $X \to Z$.

==== Proof ====
1. $X \to Y Z$	(Given)
2. $Y Z \to Y$	(Reflexivity)
3. $X \to Y$	(Transitivity of 1 & 2)

=== Composition ===
If $X \to Y$ and $A \to B$ then $X A \to Y B$.

==== Proof ====
1. $X \to Y$	(Given)
2. $A \to B$	(Given)
3. $X A \to Y A$	(Augmentation of 1 & A)
4. $Y A \to Y B$	(Augmentation of 2 & Y)
5. $X A \to Y B$	(Transitivity of 3 and 4)

=== Union ===
If $X \to Y$ and $X \to Z$ then $X \to YZ$.

==== Proof ====
1. $X \to Y$	(Given)
2. $X \to Z$	(Given)
3. $X \to X Z$	(Augmentation of 2 & X)
4. $X Z \to Y Z$	(Augmentation of 1 & Z)
5. $X \to Y Z$	(Transitivity of 3 and 4)

=== Pseudo transitivity ===
If $X \to Y$ and $Y Z \to W$ then $X Z\to W$.

==== Proof ====
1. $X \to Y$	(Given)
2. $Y Z \to W$	(Given)
3. $X Z \to Y Z$	(Augmentation of 1 & Z)
4. $XZ \to W$	(Transitivity of 3 and 2)

=== Self determination ===
$I \to I$ for any $I$. This follows directly from the axiom of reflexivity.

=== Extensivity ===
The following property is a special case of augmentation when $Z=X$.

If $X \to Y$, then $X \to X Y$.

Extensivity can replace augmentation as axiom in the sense that augmentation can be proved from extensivity together with the other axioms.

==== Proof ====
1. $X Z \to X$	(Reflexivity)
2. $X \to Y$	(Given)
3. $X Z \to Y$	(Transitivity of 1 & 2)
4. $X Z \to X Y Z$	(Extensivity of 3)
5. $X Y Z \to Y Z$	(Reflexivity)
6. $X Z \to Y Z$	(Transitivity of 4 & 5)

== Armstrong relation ==
Given a set of functional dependencies $F$, an Armstrong relation is a relation which satisfies all the functional dependencies in the closure $F^+$ and only those dependencies. The minimum-size Armstrong relation for a given set of dependencies can have a size which is an exponential function of the number of attributes in the dependencies considered.
