= SIGMOD =

Data management group

Special Interest Group on Management of Data
- Abbreviation: SIGMOD
- Discipline: databases and information systems

Publication details
- Publisher: ACM DL
- History: 1975–
- Frequency: annual
- Open access: yes
- Website: https://sigmod.org

SIGMOD is the Association for Computing Machinery's Special Interest Group on Management of Data, which specializes in large-scale data management problems and databases.

The annual ACM SIGMOD Conference, which began in 1975, is considered one of the most important in the field, and received an A* ranking over all edition of the CORE Conference Ranking system. While traditionally this conference had always been held within North America, it took place in Paris in 2004, Beijing in 2007, Athens in 2011, Melbourne in 2015, Amsterdam in 2019, Santiago de Chile in 2024 and Berlin in 2025. The acceptance rate of the ACM SIGMOD Conference, averaged from 1996 to 2012, was 18%, and it was 17% in 2012. Important publications of database systems appear first at SIGMOD, for example, the PostgreSQL database system created by Michael Stonebraker was presented in 1986, for which he received the ACM Turing Award in 2014.

In association with SIGACT and SIGAI, SIGMOD also sponsors the annual ACM Symposium on Principles of Database Systems (PODS) conference on the theoretical aspects of database systems. PODS began in 1982, and has been held jointly with the SIGMOD conference since 1991.

Each year, the group gives out several awards to contributions to the field of data management. The most important of these is the SIGMOD Edgar F. Codd Innovations Award (named after the computer scientist Edgar F. Codd), which is awarded to "innovative and highly significant contributions of enduring value to the development, understanding, or use of database systems and databases". Additionally, SIGMOD presents a Best Paper Award to recognize the highest quality paper at each conference, and Jim Gray Dissertation Award to the best Ph.D. thesis in data management.

Initially, SIGMOD offered one submission cycle per year, a frequency that increased stepwise to four rounds by 2024. Until 2022, papers from accepted submissions were published in subsequent proceedings. From 2023 onwards, the publication model changed to a rolling release similar to a journal.

== Symposium on Principles of Database Systems (PODS) ==
Symposium on Principles of Database System
- Abbreviation: PODS
- Discipline: Database theory

Publication details
- Publisher: ACM
- History: 1982–present
- Frequency: Annual
- Open access: no
- Website: https://sigmod.org/pods-home/

The ACM Symposium on Principles of Database Systems (PODS) is an international research conference on database theory, and has been held yearly since 1982. It is sponsored by three Association for Computing Machinery SIGs, SIGAI, SIGACT, and SIGMOD. Since 1991, PODS has been held jointly with the ACM SIGMOD Conference, a research conference on systems aspects of data management.

PODS is regarded as one of the top conferences in the area of database theory and data algorithms. It holds the highest rating of A* in the CORE2021 ranking. The conference typically accepts between 20 and 40 papers each year, with acceptance rates fluctuating between 25% and 35%.

== Venues of SIGMOD/PODS conferences ==
Year	Location	Link
2030	Newark	
2029	Rome	
2028	Seoul	
2027	Huntington Beach	
2026	Bangalore	
2025	Berlin	
2024	Santiago de Chile	
2023	Seattle	
2022	Philadelphia	
2021	Xi'an (partly virtual with a local event in Xi'an, Shaanxi, China)	
2020	Portland (Held fully virtual due to COVID-19 pandemic in the United States)	
2019	Amsterdam	
2018	Houston	
2017	Chicago (Previously planned for Raleigh but moved in protest of HB2 )	
2016	San Francisco	
2015	Melbourne	
2014	Snowbird	
2013	New York	
2012	Scottsdale	
2011	Athens	
2010	Indianapolis	
2009	Providence	
2008	Vancouver	
2007	Beijing	
2006	Chicago	
2005	Baltimore	
2004	Paris	
2003	San Diego	
2002	Madison	
2001	Santa Barbara	
2000	Dallas	
1999	Philadelphia	
1998	Seattle	
1997	Tucson	
1996	Montreal	
1995	San Jose	
1994	Minneapolis	
1993	Washington, DC	
1992	San Diego	
1991	Denver	
1990	Atlantic City	
1989	Portland	
1988	Chicago	
1987	San Francisco	
1986	Washington, DC	
1985	Austin	
1984	Boston	
1983	San Jose, California	
1982	Orlando, Florida	
1981	Ann Arbor	
1980	Santa Monica	
1979	Boston	
1978	Austin	
1977	Toronto	
1976	Washington, DC	
1975	San Jose	

== Gallery ==
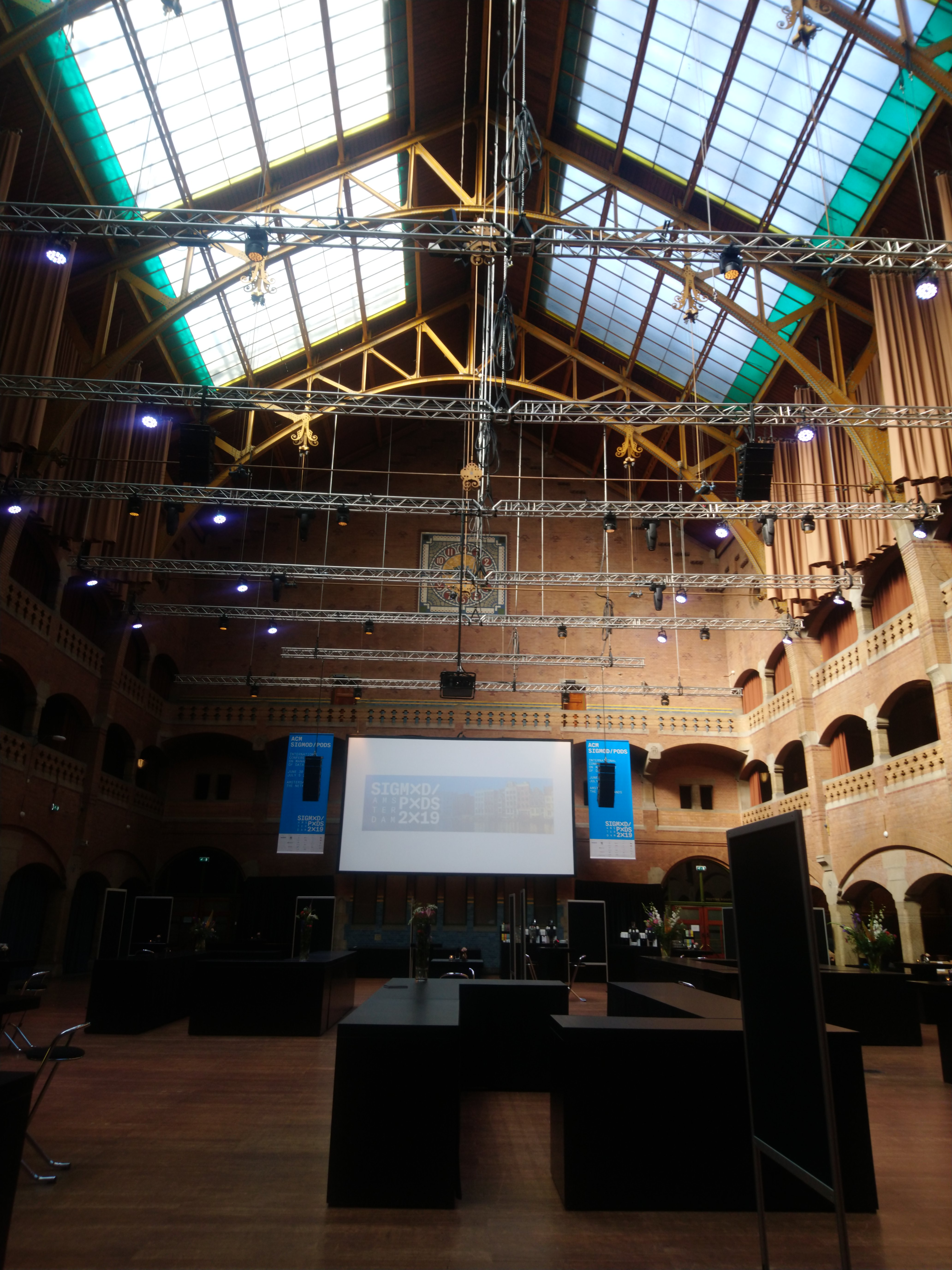
2019 in Amsterdam

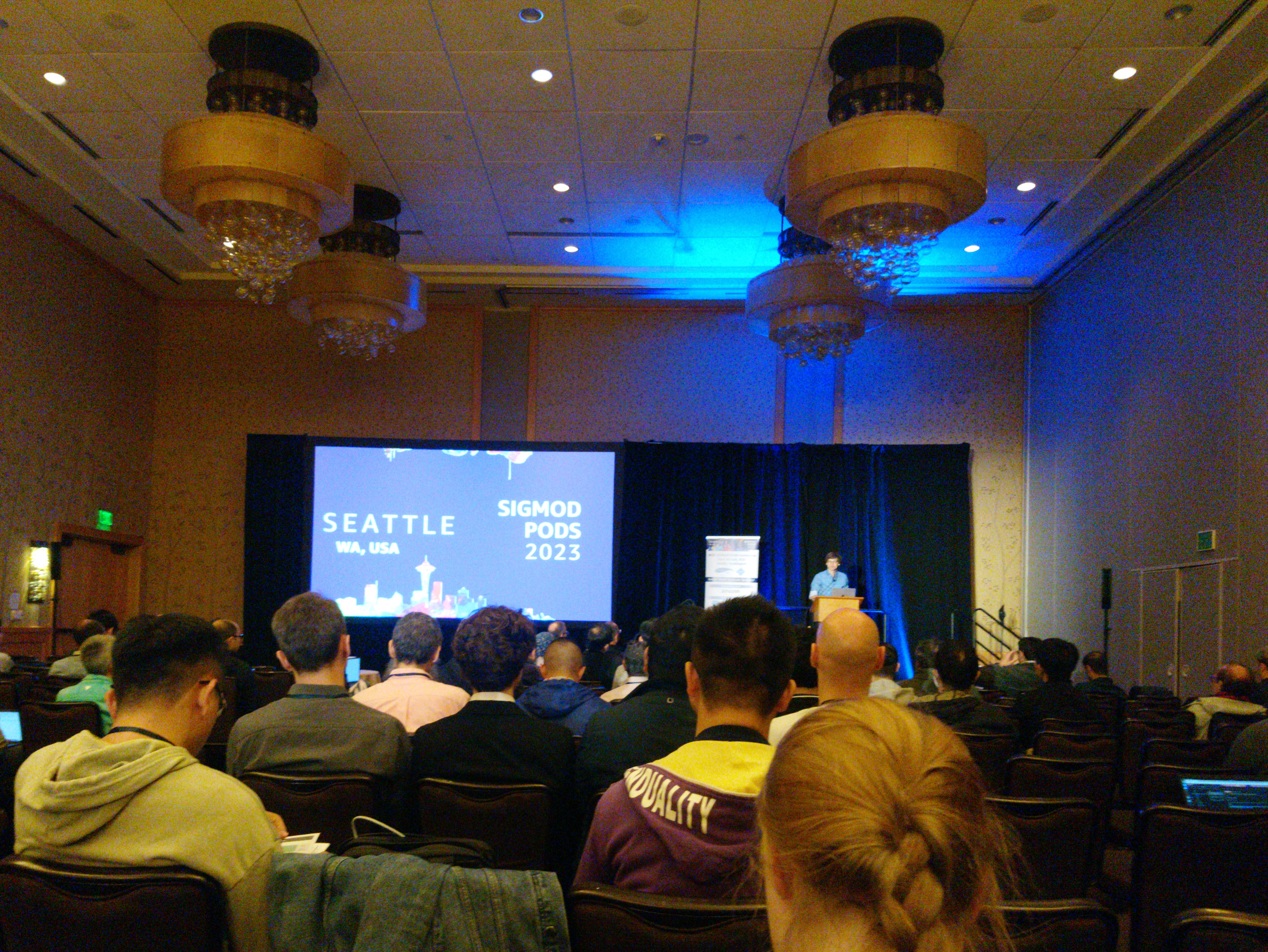
2023 in Seattle

== See also ==
- List of computer science conferences
- BTW, conference of the GI
