= Database theory =

Study of database design and use

Database theory encapsulates a broad range of topics related to the study and research of the theoretical realm of databases and database management systems.

Theoretical aspects of data management include, among other areas, the foundations of query languages, computational complexity and expressive power of queries, finite model theory, database design theory, dependency theory, foundations of concurrency control and database recovery, deductive databases, temporal and spatial databases, real-time databases, managing uncertain data and probabilistic databases, and Web data.

Most research work has traditionally been based on the relational model, since this model is usually considered the simplest and most foundational model of interest. Corresponding results for other data models, such as object-oriented or semi-structured models, or, more recently, graph data models and XML, are often derivable from those for the relational model.

Database theory helps one to understand the complexity and power of query languages and their connection to logic. Starting from relational algebra and first-order logic (which are equivalent by Codd's theorem) and the insight that important queries such as graph reachability are not expressible in this language, more powerful languages based on logic programming and fixpoint logic such as Datalog were studied. The theory also explores foundations of query optimization and data integration. Here most work studied conjunctive queries, which admit query optimization even under constraints using the chase algorithm.

The main research conferences in the area are the ACM Symposium on Principles of Database Systems (PODS) and the International Conference on Database Theory (ICDT).

== See also ==
- Data integration
- Conjunctive query
- Expressive power
