= Tickhill & Wadworth (ward) =

Electoral ward in Doncaster, England

Coordinates: 53.4330°N 1.1091°W

- Ward
- Location within South Yorkshire
- Area: 63.95 km^{2} (24.69 sq mi)
- Population: 10,248 (2011)
  - Density: 160/km^{2} (410/sq mi)
- Metropolitan borough: Doncaster
- Metropolitan county: South Yorkshire
- Region: Yorkshire and the Humber
- Country: England
- Sovereign state: United Kingdom
- UK Parliament: Doncaster Central
- Councillors: Nigel Cannings (Conservative); Martin Greenhalgh (Conservative)

Tickhill & Wadworth—consisting of Braithwell, Micklebring, Stainton, Tickhill, Wadworth and Woodfield—is one of 21 electoral wards in the Metropolitan Borough of Doncaster, South Yorkshire, England. It is represented by two Conservative Party councillors. In 2011 it had a population of 10,248. The ward was formed in 2015.
