= Wheatley Hills & Intake (ward) =

Electoral ward in Doncaster, England

Coordinates: 53.5381°N 1.1020°W

- Ward
- Location within South Yorkshire
- Area: 7.72 km^{2} (2.98 sq mi)
- Population: 17,733 (2011)
  - Density: 2,297/km^{2} (5,950/sq mi)
- Metropolitan borough: Doncaster
- Metropolitan county: South Yorkshire
- Region: Yorkshire and the Humber
- Country: England
- Sovereign state: United Kingdom
- UK Parliament: Doncaster Central
- Councillors: Jane Kidd (Labour); Emma Muddiman-Rawlins (Labour); Yetunde Elebuibon (Labour)

Wheatley Hills & Intake is one of 21 electoral wards in the Metropolitan Borough of Doncaster, South Yorkshire, England. It forms part of the Doncaster Central parliamentary constituency. It covers the Doncaster inner suburbs of Wheatley Hills and Intake. It is represented by 3 councillors on Doncaster Metropolitan Borough Council. In 2011 it had a population of 17,733. The ward was formed in 2015.
