= Hexthorpe =

Suburb of Doncaster, England

Coordinates: 53.51563°N 1.15296°W

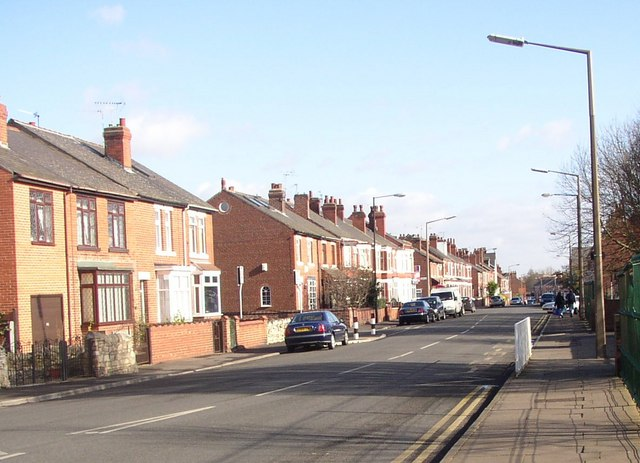
- Urban Road

- Location within South Yorkshire
- Population: 3,310
- OS grid reference: SE562024
- Metropolitan borough: Doncaster
- Metropolitan county: South Yorkshire
- Region: Yorkshire and the Humber
- Country: England
- Sovereign state: United Kingdom
- Post town: DONCASTER
- Postcode district: DN4
- Dialling code: 01302
- Police: South Yorkshire
- Fire: South Yorkshire
- Ambulance: Yorkshire
- UK Parliament: Doncaster Central

Hexthorpe is a suburb of Doncaster, South Yorkshire, England. Historically part of the West Riding of Yorkshire, the area's shape resembles a rhombus, with borders with Balby and Doncaster city centre, separated by railway lines and the river separating the area from the villages of Sprotbrough and Newton. The Hexthorpe House was a well known pub in the area. Following a fire, the pub remained derelict for a few months and the remains were demolished in 2009. The old pub sign was saved and has now been erected in Hexthorpe Flatts Park.

== Education ==
Schooling of four to eleven-year-old children is provided in the local area by Hexthorpe Primary School, which also offers a nursery for pre-school-aged children. The school is listed by Ofsted as one of the highest achieving schools in the borough. Children living in Hexthorpe, who are of secondary school age, fall within the catchment areas for Hall Cross Academy, Astrea Academy Woodfields and Doncaster College.

There are two industrial estates in Hexthorpe: one at Cherry Tree Road, and the other somewhere within Hexthorpes industrial boundaries. The area is currently earmarked for demolition, with the aim of boosting the local commerce and residential wellbeing.

There is a large park around Hexthorpe Primary School, which is called Hexthorpe Flatts. The park used to be maintained by a park keeper, who resided in the park keeper's house within the park grounds. The council no longer employs park keepers now, and Hexthorpe Flatts has fallen into major decline. The area does still remain popular with local youth throughout the areas of Balby and Hexthorpe. One popular attraction within Hexthorpe Flatts is the Dell, a bandstand made out of wood in what was a small quarry. The quarry was landscaped and cultivated after it fell into disuse. The park is situated alongside the River Don and is separated from Balby by a rail line, however pedestrians are able to enter the park from Balby by means of a footbridge over the railway lines. There is an entrance to the park from Bramworth Road, where the Hexthorpe Manor is also located.

Hexthorpe Manor is now a community for people aged between 18 and 30 recovering from "severe trauma, illnesses and other similar situations" [Hexthorpe Manor]. The Manor was run as an extension of the Holy Rood House at Thirsk, but Hexthorpe Manor Community is now a charitable company in its own right. However, in August 2010, the lease of the Manor House was taken over by a new charitable organisation Rebound (a mental health charity) offering accommodation to vulnerable adults.

== Plant works ==
Hexthorpe is situated next to the Plant Works at Doncaster, which was famous for building the Flying Scotsman, and Mallard, an A4 locomotive. Until recently it was used as a repair yard for trains, ceasing to build new engines. Only a fraction, next to Doncaster railway station exists, with the rest, demolished to make way for housing. An extensive remedial operation was needed to cover the asbestos and other industrial contaminants with various protective layers and 300mm of topsoil. In places the depth of cover exceeds 1 metre.

== Park ==
The park has a BMX track, the first track in the UK with a split section also has two bowls: 5 ft and 3 ft. The 5 ft bowl has two hips.

== Transport ==
Hexthorpe is very close to Doncaster town centre. It is easily accessible, and the bus route 71 covers the route to Doncaster Frenchgate. The village used to contain a trolleybus route into town, but in 1963 this was taken out and replaced with a single decker motorbus service.

There were three railway stations in the area of Hexthorpe: Hexthorpe railway platform, the scene of a major rail accident in 1887 and closed for a long time, in the west of the village, Cherrytree, the original terminus of the South Yorkshire Railway, open from 1849 to 1852, in the east, and St. James' Bridge, somewhat closer to Doncaster than Cherrytree, but only used for excursion trains and closed by 1946.
