= Hexthorpe & Balby North (ward) =

Electoral ward in Doncaster, England

Coordinates: 53.5157°N 1.1518°W

- Ward
- Area: 4.57 km^{2} (1.76 sq mi)
- Population: 12,308 (2011)
  - Density: 2,693/km^{2} (6,970/sq mi)
- Metropolitan borough: Doncaster
- Metropolitan county: South Yorkshire
- Region: Yorkshire and the Humber
- Country: England
- Sovereign state: United Kingdom
- UK Parliament: Doncaster Central
- Councillors: Glyn Jones (Labour); Sophie Liu (Labour)

Hexthorpe & Balby North—consisting of Hexthorpe and the northern part of Balby—is one of 21 electoral wards in the Metropolitan Borough of Doncaster, South Yorkshire, England. It forms part of the Doncaster Central parliamentary constituency. It elects 2 councillors.
