= Edenthorpe & Kirk Sandall (ward) =

Electoral ward in Doncaster, England

Coordinates: 53.5579°N 1.0758°W

- Ward
- Location within South Yorkshire
- Area: 8.37 km^{2} (3.23 sq mi)
- Population: 9,955 (2011)
  - Density: 1,189/km^{2} (3,080/sq mi)
- Metropolitan borough: Doncaster
- Metropolitan county: South Yorkshire
- Region: Yorkshire and the Humber
- Country: England
- Sovereign state: United Kingdom
- UK Parliament: Doncaster Central
- Councillors: David Nevett (Labour); Andrea Robinson (Labour)

Edenthorpe & Kirk Sandall—consisting of Edenthorpe and Kirk Sandall—is one of 21 electoral wards in the Metropolitan Borough of Doncaster, South Yorkshire, England. It forms part of the Doncaster Central parliamentary constituency. It elects two councillors to Doncaster Metropolitan Borough Council, both currently held by Labour. UKIP have held the seat in the past. In 2011 it had a population of 9,955. The ward was formed in 2015.
