= Town (Doncaster ward) =

Electoral ward in Doncaster, England

Coordinates: 53.5232°N 1.1340°W

- Ward
- Location within South Yorkshire
- Area: 7.62 km^{2} (2.94 sq mi)
- Population: 20,269 (2011)
  - Density: 2,660/km^{2} (6,900/sq mi)
- Metropolitan borough: Doncaster
- Metropolitan county: South Yorkshire
- Region: Yorkshire and the Humber
- Country: England
- Sovereign state: United Kingdom
- UK Parliament: Doncaster Central
- Councillors: Gemma Cobby (Labour); Dave Shaw (Labour); Jake Kearsley (Labour)

Town—consisting of central Doncaster, Hyde Park, Belle Vue and Wheatley—is one of 21 electoral wards in the Metropolitan Borough of Doncaster, South Yorkshire, England. It forms part of the Doncaster Central parliamentary constituency. It is represented by 3 councillors, all currently held by the Labour Party. In 2011 it had a population of 20,269. The ward was formed in 2015.
