= Rosie Winterton =

British politician (born 1958)

The Right Honourable The Baroness Winterton of Doncaster DBE PC
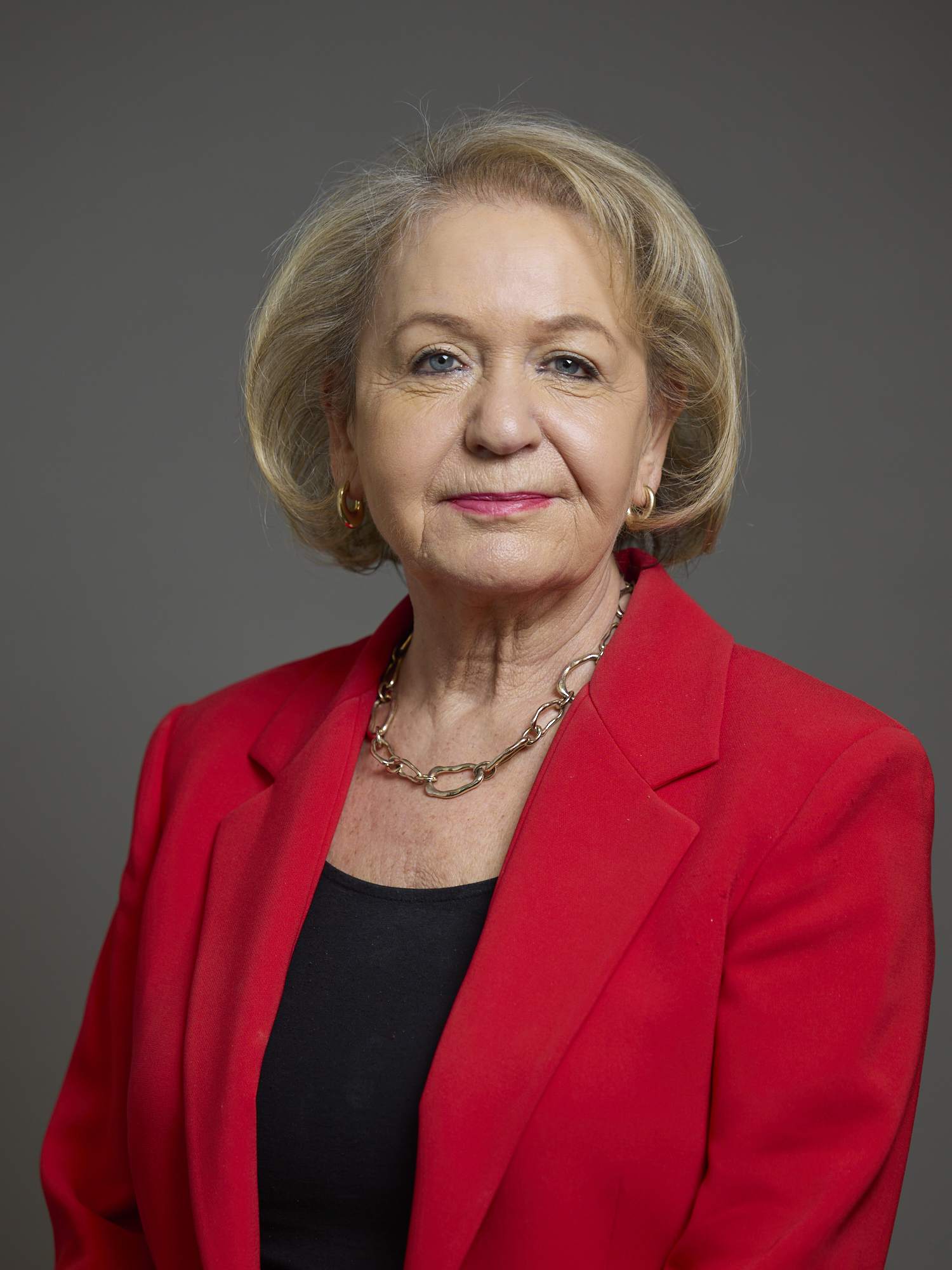
- Official portrait, 2025

Parliamentary Under-Secretary of State for Indo-Pacific
- Incumbent
- Assumed office 21 July 2026
- Prime Minister: Andy Burnham
- Preceded by: Seema Malhotra
Other junior ministerial roles
Minister of State for Local Government Minister of State for Regional Economic Development and Coordination
In office 5 June 2009 – 11 May 2010
Prime Minister	Gordon Brown
Preceded by	John Healey
Succeeded by	Grant Shapps
Minister of State for Pensions
In office 24 January 2008 – 5 June 2009
Prime Minister	Gordon Brown
Preceded by	Mike O'Brien
Succeeded by	Angela Eagle
Minister for Yorkshire and the Humber
In office 24 January 2008 – 11 May 2010
Prime Minister	Gordon Brown
Preceded by	Caroline Flint
Succeeded by	Office abolished
Minister of State for Transport
In office 28 June 2007 – 3 October 2008
Prime Minister	Gordon Brown
Preceded by	Stephen Ladyman
Succeeded by	The Lord Adonis
Minister of State for Health Services
In office 13 June 2003 – 28 June 2007
Prime Minister	Tony Blair
Preceded by	Jacqui Smith
Succeeded by	Ben Bradshaw
Parliamentary Secretary to the Lord Chancellor's Department
In office 11 June 2001 – 13 June 2003 Serving with Patricia Scotland, Michael Wills (until May 2002) and Yvette Cooper (from May 2002)
Prime Minister	Tony Blair
Preceded by	David Lock
Succeeded by	Office abolished
Parliamentary offices
Deputy Speaker of the House of Commons
In office 28 June 2017 – 30 May 2024
Monarchs	Elizabeth II; Charles III
Prime Minister	Theresa May; Boris Johnson; Liz Truss; Rishi Sunak
Speaker	John Bercow; Sir Lindsay Hoyle
First Deputy Chairman of Ways and Means
In office 8 January 2020 – 30 May 2024
Speaker	Sir Lindsay Hoyle
Preceded by	Dame Eleanor Laing
Succeeded by	Judith Cummins
Second Deputy Chairman of Ways and Means
In office 28 June 2017 – 6 November 2019
Speaker	John Bercow; Sir Lindsay Hoyle
Preceded by	Natascha Engel
Succeeded by	Nigel Evans
Opposition Chief Whip of the House of Commons
In office 8 October 2010 – 6 October 2016
Leader	Ed Miliband; Harriet Harman (acting); Jeremy Corbyn
Preceded by	Nick Brown
Succeeded by	Nick Brown
Shadow Leader of the House of Commons
In office 12 May 2010 – 8 October 2010
Leader	Harriet Harman (acting)
Preceded by	George Young
Succeeded by	Hilary Benn
Member of the House of Lords
Lord Temporal
Life peerage 13 August 2024
Member of Parliament for Doncaster Central
In office 1 May 1997 – 30 May 2024
Preceded by	Harold Walker
Succeeded by	Sally Jameson

Personal details
- Born: Rosalie Winterton; 10 August 1958 (age 68) Leicester, England
- Party: Labour
- Education: University of Hull (BA)

Rosalie Winterton, Baroness Winterton of Doncaster, DBE, PC (born 10 August 1958), is a British Labour Party politician who has served as Parliamentary Under-Secretary of State for Indo-Pacific since 2026. She previously served as Member of Parliament (MP) for Doncaster Central from 1997 to 2024. She served as a Deputy Speaker in the House of Commons from 2017 to 2024. She became a member of the House of Lords in 2024.

Winterton served under Prime Minister Tony Blair as a minister in the Department for Health, then under Gordon Brown as Minister of State for Transport from 2007 to 2008, Minister for Work and Pensions from 2008 to 2009, and Minister for Local Government from 2009 to 2010. She later entered the Shadow Cabinet in May 2010 as the Shadow Leader of the House of Commons.

In September 2010, Winterton was nominated and elected unopposed as Labour Chief Whip and served in the post until October 2016. She was elected as one of three deputy speakers of the House of Commons on 28 June 2017 and re-elected unopposed on 7 January 2020, Winterton stood down at the 2024 general election and was elevated to the House of Lords later that year.

== Early life ==
Rosalie Winterton was born on 10 August 1958 to Gordon and Valerie Winterton. She was educated at St Mary's (now Hill House School, Doncaster), Ackworth School (an independent school), and Doncaster Grammar School on Thorne Road (now Hall Cross Academy). She then gained a Bachelor of Arts (BA) degree in history at the University of Hull, graduating in 1979. Winterton worked as John Prescott's constituency personal assistant from 1980 to 1986, and then as a parliamentary officer for Southwark Council for two years to 1988 and subsequently for the Royal College of Nursing for another two years to 1990.

After working for four years in the private sector, as managing director of Connect Public Affairs, she returned to politics to assist John Prescott in 1994; Prescott had been elected as the Deputy Leader of the Labour Party, and Winterton worked as Head of Office for the Deputy Party Leader until 1997.

== Parliamentary career ==
Winterton became an MP in the 1997 election, serving the safe Labour seat of Doncaster Central constituency with a vote share exceeding 50% in each general election until 2010, where her vote share fell to 39.7%.

She entered government in 2001, serving as a Parliamentary Under-Secretary of State in the Lord Chancellor's Department, and became a Minister of State at the Department for Health in June 2003; in January 2006 her responsibilities were changed to Health Services, including responsibility for NHS dentistry. She presided over the introduction of the new NHS dental contract of April 2006.

In June 2007, she was appointed Minister of State at the Department for Transport by the new Prime Minister, Gordon Brown. Winterton was subsequently appointed Minister for Yorkshire and the Humber in addition to her DfT responsibilities on 24 January 2008. She was promoted to Minister of State for Pensions at the Department for Work and Pensions in the October 2008 reshuffle, retaining her Ministerial brief for Yorkshire and the Humber.

In the June 2009 reshuffle, Winterton was moved to Minister of State for Regional Economic Development and Co-ordination at the Department for Business, Innovation and Skills and the Department for Communities and Local Government and, in that role, was invited to attend cabinet when her responsibility was on the agenda.

Following the 2010 general election, she was appointed Shadow Leader of the House of Commons and Shadow Minister for Women and Equalities in Harriet Harman's interim shadow cabinet. In September 2010, she was nominated and elected unopposed as Labour Chief Whip and served until October 2016, when she was replaced by Nick Brown.

In June 2017, Winterton was elected to serve as the Second Deputy Chairman of Ways and Means. From 2017 to 2024, she was the only one of the Speaker team to have previously served as a government minister.

On 27 February 2022, Winterton announced her intention to stand down at the 2024 general election.

== Expenses scandal ==
Winterton was one of a number of Government Ministers who secretly repaid back some of expenses money which they had wrongly claimed. In the row over MPs' expenses, it was claimed she used taxpayers' cash to soundproof the bedroom of her south London flat. According to The Daily Telegraph, the minister claimed a total of £86,277 over four years in additional costs allowance—close to the total allowed under Parliament's green book.

== Honours ==
In June 2006, she was appointed a member of the Privy Council, and she was sworn in on 19 July 2006.

She was appointed Dame Commander of the Order of the British Empire (DBE) in the 2016 New Year Honours.

After standing down as an MP, Winterton was nominated for a life peerage in the 2024 Dissolution Honours. She was created Baroness Winterton of Doncaster, of Doncaster in the County of South Yorkshire, on 13 August 2024.

Parliament of the United Kingdom
Preceded by Harold Walker	Member of Parliament for Doncaster Central; 1997–2024	Succeeded by Sally Jameson
Political offices
Preceded by Stephen Ladyman	Minister of State for Transport; 2007–2008	Succeeded by The Lord Adonis
Preceded by Caroline Flint	Minister of State for Work and Pensions; 2008–2009	Succeeded by Angela Eagle
Preceded by John Healey	Minister for Yorkshire and the Humber; 2008–2010	Position abolished
Preceded by John Healey	Minister of State for Local Government; 2009–2010	Succeeded by Grant Shapps
Preceded by George Young	Shadow Leader of the House of Commons; 2010	Succeeded by Hilary Benn
Preceded by Nick Brown	Shadow Chief Whip of the House of Commons; 2010–2016	Succeeded by Nick Brown
Party political offices
Preceded by Nick Brown	Labour Chief Whip of the House of Commons; 2010–2016	Succeeded by Nick Brown
