= Indirection =

Computers accessing information referentially

In computer science, an indirection is a way of referring to something using a name, reference, or container instead of the value itself. The most common form of indirection is the act of manipulating a value through its memory address; e.g., accessing a variable through the use of a pointer. A stored pointer that exists to provide a reference to an object by double indirection is called an indirection node. In some older computer architectures, indirect words supported a variety of more-or-less complicated addressing modes.

Another important example is the domain name system which enables names such as en.wikipedia.org to be used in place of network addresses such as 208.80.154.224. The indirection from human-readable names to network addresses means that the references to a web page become more memorable, and links do not need to change when a web site is relocated to a different server.

== Overview ==
A famous aphorism of Butler Lampson that is attributed to David Wheeler goes: "All problems in computer science can be solved by another level of indirection" (the "fundamental theorem of software engineering"). This is often deliberately mis-quoted with "abstraction layer" substituted for "level of indirection". A corollary to this aphorism, and the original conclusion from Wheeler, is "...except for the problem of too many layers of indirection."

A humorous Internet memorandum, RFC 1925, insists that:

(6) It is easier to move a problem around (for example, by moving the problem to a different part of the overall network architecture) than it is to solve it.

(6a) (corollary). It is always possible to add another level of indirection.

Object-oriented programming makes use of indirection extensively, a simple example being dynamic dispatch. Higher-level examples of indirection are the design patterns of the proxy and the proxy server. Delegation is another classic example of an indirection pattern. In strongly typed interpreted languages with dynamic data types, most variable references require a level of indirection: first the type of the variable is checked for safety, and then the pointer to the actual value is dereferenced and acted on.

In languages with statically sized types, indirection is often used to define recursive data types. For example, Rust requires recursive enum variants to contain a pointer-like type such as Box<T>, Rc<T> rather than directly containing another value of the same type. This gives the recursive type a known size, because the variant stores a pointer of fixed size while the recursive value is stored elsewhere.

When doing symbolic programming from a formal mathematical specification the use of indirection can be quite helpful. To start with a simple example the variables x, y and z in an equation such as $z = \sqrt{ x^2 + y^2}$ can refer to any number. One could imagine objects for various numbers and then x, y and z could point to the specific numbers being used for a particular problem. The simple example has its limitation as there are infinitely many real numbers. In various other parts of symbolic programming there are only so many symbols. So to move on to a more significant example, in logic the formula α can refer to any formula, so it could be β, γ, δ, ... or η→π, ς ∨ σ, ... When set-builder notation is employed the statement Δ={α} means the set of all formulae — so although the reference is to α there are two levels of indirection here, the first to the set of all α and then the second to a specific formula for each occurrence of α in the set Δ.

== See also ==
- Abstraction (computer science)
- Delegation pattern
- Dereference operator
- Handle
- Law of Demeter
- Pointer
- Reference
