= Stainforth & Barnby Dun (ward) =

Electoral ward in Doncaster, England

Coordinates: 53.5901°N 1.0279°W

- Ward
- Location within South Yorkshire
- Area: 17.23 km^{2} (6.65 sq mi)
- Population: 9,695 (2011)
  - Density: 563/km^{2} (1,460/sq mi)
- Metropolitan borough: Doncaster
- Metropolitan county: South Yorkshire
- Region: Yorkshire and the Humber
- Country: England
- Sovereign state: United Kingdom
- UK Parliament: Doncaster North (Stainforth) and Doncaster Central (Barnby Dun)
- Councillors: Sue Farmer (Labour); Gary Stapleton (Conservative)

Stainforth & Barnby Dun is one of 21 electoral wards in the Metropolitan Borough of Doncaster, South Yorkshire, England, covering the town of Stainforth and Barnby Dun. It is split between the Doncaster Central and North constituencies. In 2011 it had a population of 9,695. The ward was formed in 2015.
