= List of electoral wards in South Yorkshire =

This is a list of electoral divisions and wards in the ceremonial county of South Yorkshire in Yorkshire and the Humber. All changes since the re-organisation of local government following the passing of the Local Government Act 1972 are shown. The number of councillors elected for each electoral division or ward is shown in brackets.

== District councils ==
=== Barnsley ===
Wards from 1 April 1974 (first election 10 May 1973) to 3 May 1979:

Wards from 3 May 1979 to 10 June 2004:

Wards from 10 June 2004 to 7 May 2026:

1. Central (3)
2. Cudworth (3)
3. Darfield (3)
4. Darton East (3)
5. Darton West (3)
6. Dearne North (3)
7. Dearne South (3)
8. Dodworth (3)
9. Hoyland Milton (3)
10. Kingstone (3)
11. Monk Bretton (3)
12. North East (3)
13. Old Town (3)
14. Penistone East (3)
15. Penistone West (3)
16. Rockingham (3)
17. Royston (3)
18. St Helens (3)
19. Stairfoot (3)
20. Wombwell (3)
21. Worsbrough (3)

Wards from 7 May 2026 to present:

1. Athersley & New Lodge (3)
2. Central (3)
3. Cudworth (3)
4. Darfield & Great Houghton (3)
5. Darton East (3)
6. Darton West (3)
7. Dearne North (3)
8. Dearne South (3)
9. Dodworth, Stainborough & Tankersley (3)
10. Hoyland Milton (3)
11. Kingstone (3)
12. Monk Bretton (3)
13. North East (3)
14. Old Town (3)
15. Penistone East (3)
16. Penistone West (3)
17. Rockingham (3)
18. Royston (3)
19. Stairfoot (3)
20. Wombwell (3)
21. Worsbrough (3)

=== Doncaster ===
Wards from 1 April 1974 (first election 10 May 1973) to 1 May 1980:

Wards from 1 May 1980 to 10 June 2004:

Wards from 10 June 2004 to 7 May 2015:

1. Adwick (3)
2. Armthorpe (3)
3. Askern Spa (3)
4. Balby (3)
5. Bentley (3)
6. Bessacarr & Cantley (3)
7. Central (3)
8. Conisbrough & Denaby (3)
9. Edenthorpe, Kirk Sandall & Barnby Dun (3)
10. Edlington & Warmsworth (3)
11. Finningley (3)
12. Great North Road (3)
13. Hatfield (3)
14. Mexborough (3)
15. Rossington (3)
16. Sprotbrough (3)
17. Stainforth & Moorends (3)
18. Thorne (3)
19. Torne Valley (3)
20. Town Moor (3)
21. Wheatley (3)

Wards from 7 May 2015 to present:

1. Adwick le Street & Carcroft (3)
2. Armthorpe (3)
3. Balby South (2)
4. Bentley (3)
5. Bessacarr (3)
6. Conisbrough (3)
7. Edenthorpe & Kirk Sandall (2)
8. Edlington & Warmsworth (2)
9. Finningley (3)
10. Hatfield (3)
11. Hexthorpe & Balby North (2)
12. Mexborough (3)
13. Norton & Askern (3)
14. Roman Ridge (2)
15. Rossington & Bawtry (3)
16. Sprotbrough (2)
17. Stainforth & Barnby Dun (2)
18. Thorne & Moorends (3)
19. Tickhill & Wadsworth (2)
20. Town (3)
21. Wheatley Hills & Intake (3)

=== Rotherham ===
Wards from 1 April 1974 (first election 10 May 1973) to 1 May 1980:

Wards from 1 May 1980 to 10 June 2004:

Wards from 10 June 2004 to 6 May 2021:

1. Anston & Woodsetts (3) †
2. Boston Castle (3)
3. Brinsworth & Catcliffe (3)
4. Dinnington (3) †
5. Hellaby (3)
6. Holderness (3)
7. Hoober (3)
8. Keppel (3)
9. Maltby (3)
10. Rawmarsh (3)
11. Rotherham East (3)
12. Rotherham West (3)
13. Rother Vale (3)
14. Silverwood (3)
15. Sitwell (3)
16. Swinton (3)
17. Valley (3)
18. Wales (3)
19. Wath (3)
20. Wickersley (3)
21. Wingfield (3)

† minor boundary changes in 2011

Wards from 6 May 2021 to present:

1. Anston and Woodsetts (3)
2. Aston and Todwick (2)
3. Aughton and Swallownest (2)
4. Boston Castle (3)
5. Bramley and Ravenfield (2)
6. Brinsworth (2)
7. Dalton and Thrybergh (2)
8. Dinnington (3)
9. Greasbrough (2)
10. Hellaby and Maltby West (2)
11. Hoober (3)
12. Keppel (3)
13. Kilnhurst and Swinton East (2)
14. Maltby East (2)
15. Rawmarsh East (2)
16. Rawmarsh West (2)
17. Rother Vale (2)
18. Rotherham East (3)
19. Rotherham West (3)
20. Sitwell (3)
21. Swinton Rockingham (2)
22. Thurcroft and Wickersley South (2)
23. Wales (2)
24. Wath (2)
25. Wickersley North (3)

=== Sheffield ===
Wards from 1 April 1974 (first election 10 May 1973) to 1 May 1980:

1. Attercliffe (3)
2. Beauchief (3)
3. Birley (3)
4. Brightside (3)
5. Broomhill (3)
6. Burngreave (3)
7. Castle (3)
8. Chapel Green (3)
9. Darnall (3)
10. Dore (3)
11. Ecclesall (3)
12. Firth Park (3)
13. Gleadless (3)
14. Hallam (3)
15. Handsworth (3)
16. Heeley (3)
17. Hillsborough (3)
18. Intake (3)
19. Manor (3)
20. Mosborough (3)
21. Nether Edge (3)
22. Nether Shire (3)
23. Netherthorpe (3)
24. Owlerton (3)
25. Park (3)
26. Sharrow (3)
27. South Wortley (3)
28. Southey Green (3)
29. Stocksbridge (3)
30. Walkley (3)

Wards from 1 May 1980 to 10 June 2004:

1. Beauchief (3)
2. Birley (3)
3. Brightside (3)
4. Broomhill (3)
5. Burngreave (3)
6. Castle (3)
7. Chapel Green (3)
8. Darnall (3)
9. Dore (3)
10. Ecclesall (3)
11. Firth Park (3)
12. Hallam (3)
13. Handsworth (3)
14. Heeley (3)
15. Hillsborough (3)
16. Intake (3)
17. Manor (3)
18. Mosborough (3)
19. Nether Edge (3)
20. Nether Shire (3)
21. Netherthorpe (3)
22. Norton (3)
23. Owlerton (3)
24. Park (3)
25. Sharrow (3)
26. South Wortley (3)
27. Southey Green (3)
28. Stocksbridge (3)
29. Walkley (3)

Wards from 10 June 2004 to 5 May 2016:

1. Arbourthorne (3)
2. Beauchief and Greenhill (3)
3. Beighton (3)
4. Birley (3)
5. Broomhill and Sharrow Vale (3)
6. Burngreave (3)
7. Central (3)
8. Crookes & Crosspool (3)
9. Darnall (3)
10. Dore and Totley (3)
11. East Ecclesfield (3)
12. Ecclesall (3)
13. Firth Park (3)
14. Fulwood (3)
15. Gleadless Valley (3)
16. Graves Park (3)
17. Hillsborough (3)
18. Manor Castle (3)
19. Mosborough (3)
20. Nether Edge (3)
21. Richmond (3)
22. Shiregreen and Brightside (3)
23. Southey (3)
24. Stannington (3)
25. Stocksbridge and Upper Don (3)
26. Walkley (3)
27. West Ecclesfield (3)
28. Woodhouse (3)

Wards from 5 May 2016 to present:

1. Beauchief and Greenhill (3)
2. Beighton (3)
3. Birley (3)
4. Broomhill and Sharrow Vale (3)
5. Burngreave (3)
6. City (3)
7. Crookes & Crosspool (3)
8. Darnall (3)
9. Dore and Totley (3)
10. East Ecclesfield (3)
11. Ecclesall (3)
12. Firth Park (3)
13. Fulwood (3)
14. Gleadless Valley (3)
15. Graves Park (3)
16. Hillsborough (3)
17. Manor Castle (3)
18. Mosborough (3)
19. Nether Edge and Sharrow (3)
20. Park & Arbourthorne (3)
21. Richmond (3)
22. Shiregreen and Brightside (3)
23. Southey (3)
24. Stannington (3)
25. Stocksbridge and Upper Don (3)
26. Walkley (3)
27. West Ecclesfield (3)
28. Woodhouse (3)

== Former county council ==
=== South Yorkshire ===
Electoral Divisions from 1 April 1974 (first election 12 April 1973) to 1 April 1986 (county abolished):

1. Adwick-le-Street (1)
2. Barnsley No. 1 (1)
3. Barnsley No. 2 (1)
4. Barnsley No. 3 (1)
5. Barnsley No. 4 (1)
6. Barnsley No. 5 (1)
7. Barnsley No. 6 (1)
8. Bentley-with-Arksey No. 1 (1)
9. Bentley-with-Arksey No. 2 (1)
10. Conisbrough (1)
11. Cudworth (1)
12. Darfield (1)
13. Darton (1)
14. Dearne No. 1 (1)
15. Dearne No. 2 (1)
16. Dodworth (1)
17. Doncaster No. 1 (1)
18. Doncaster No. 2 (1)
19. Doncaster No. 3 (1)
20. Doncaster No. 4 (Wheatley) (1)
21. Doncaster No. 5 (Intake) (1)
22. Doncaster No. 6 (Bessacarr) (1)
23. Doncaster Rural No. 1 (1)
24. Doncaster Rural No. 2 (1)
25. Doncaster Rural No. 3 (1)
26. Doncaster Rural No. 4 (1)
27. Doncaster Rural No. 5 (1)
28. Doncaster Rural No. 6 (1)
29. Hemsworth (1)
30. Hoyland (1)
31. Kiveton Park No. 1 (1)
32. Kiveton Park No. 2 (1)
33. Maltby (1)
34. Mexborough (1)
35. Penistone (1)
36. Penistone Rural (1)
37. Rawmarsh No. 1 (1)
38. Rawmarsh No. 2 (1)
39. Rotherham No. 1 (1)
40. Rotherham No. 2 (1)
41. Rotherham No. 3 (1)
42. Rotherham No. 4 (1)
43. Rotherham No. 5 (1)
44. Rotherham No. 6 (1)
45. Rotherham Rural No. 1 (1)
46. Rotherham Rural No. 2 (1)
47. Rotherham Rural No. 3 (1)
48. Rotherham Rural No. 4 (1)
49. Rotherham Rural No. 5 (1)
50. Royston (1)
51. Sheffield No. 1 (3)
52. Sheffield No. 2 (3)
53. Sheffield No. 3 (3)
54. Sheffield No. 4 (3)
55. Sheffield No. 5 (3)
56. Sheffield No. 6 (3)
57. Sheffield No. 7 (3)
58. Sheffield No. 8 (3)
59. Sheffield No. 9 (3)
60. Sheffield No. 10 (3)
61. Sheffield No. 11 (3)
62. Sheffield No. 12 (3)
63. Sheffield No. 13 (3)
64. Stocksbridge (1)
65. Swinton (1)
66. Thorne No. 1 (1)
67. Thorne No. 2 (1)
68. Thorne No. 3 (1)
69. Wath upon Dearne (1)
70. Wombwell (1)
71. Worsbrough (1)
72. Wortley No. 1 (1)
73. Wortley No. 2 (1)
74. Wortley No. 3 (1)

== Electoral wards by constituency ==
Wards as they existed on 1 December 2020.

=== Barnsley North ===
Barnsley: Central; Cudworth; Darton East; Darton West; Monk Bretton; North East; Old Town; Royston; St. Helens.

=== Barnsley South ===
Barnsley: Darfield; Dearne North; Dearne South; Hoyland Milton; Kingstone; Rockingham; Stairfoot; Wombwell; Worsbrough.

=== Doncaster Central ===
Doncaster: Armthorpe; Balby South; Bessacarr; Edenthorpe & Kirk Sandall; Hexthorpe & Balby North; Tickhill & Wadworth; Town; Wheatley Hills & Intake.

=== Doncaster East and the Isle of Axholme (part) ===
Doncaster: Finningley; Hatfield; Rossington & Bawtry; Thorne & Moorends.

=== Doncaster North ===
Doncaster: Adwick le Street & Carcroft; Bentley; Mexborough; Norton & Askern; Roman Ridge; Sprotbrough; Stainforth & Barnby Dun.

=== Penistone and Stocksbridge ===
Barnsley: Dodworth; Penistone East; Penistone West.

Sheffield: East Ecclesfield; Stocksbridge & Upper Don; West Ecclesfield.

=== Rawmarsh and Conisbrough ===
Doncaster: Conisbrough; Edlington & Warmsworth.

Rotherham: Bramley & Ravenfield; Hoober; Kilnhurst & Swinton East; Rawmarsh East; Rawmarsh West; Swinton Rockingham; Wath.

=== Rother Valley ===
Rotherham: Anston & Woodsetts; Aston & Todwick; Aughton & Swallownest; Dinnington; Hellaby & Maltby West; Maltby East; Sitwell; Thurcroft & Wickersley South; Wales.

=== Rotherham ===
Rotherham: Boston Castle; Brinsworth; Dalton & Thrybergh; Greasbrough; Keppel; Rother Vale; Rotherham East; Rotherham West; Wickersley North.

=== Sheffield Brightside and Hillsborough ===
Sheffield: Burngreave; Firth Park; Hillsborough; Shiregreen & Brightside; Southey.

=== Sheffield Central ===
Sheffield: Broomhill & Sharrow Vale; City; Nether Edge & Sharrow; Walkley.

=== Sheffield Hallam ===
Sheffield: Crookes & Crosspool; Dore & Totley; Ecclesall; Fulwood; Stannington.

=== Sheffield Heeley ===
Sheffield: Beauchief & Greenhill; Gleadless Valley; Graves Park; Manor Castle; Park & Arbourthorne; Richmond (polling districts UB, UC & UE).

=== Sheffield South East ===
Sheffield: Beighton; Birley; Darnall; Mosborough; Richmond (polling districts UA, UD, UF, UG & UH); Woodhouse.

== See also ==
- List of parliamentary constituencies in South Yorkshire
