= Balby South (ward) =

Electoral ward in Doncaster, England

Coordinates: 53.4998°N 1.1520°W

- Ward
- Location within South Yorkshire
- Area: 3.97 km^{2} (1.53 sq mi)
- Population: 10,011 (2011)
  - Density: 2,522/km^{2} (6,530/sq mi)
- Metropolitan borough: Doncaster
- Metropolitan county: South Yorkshire
- Region: Yorkshire and the Humber
- Country: England
- Sovereign state: United Kingdom
- UK Parliament: Doncaster Central
- Councillors: John Healy (Labour); Tracey Moran (Labour)

Balby South—consisting of the southern part of the suburb of Balby—is one of 21 electoral wards in the Doncaster district, in the county of South Yorkshire, England. It forms part of the Doncaster Central parliamentary constituency. It is represented by 2 councillors on Doncaster Metropolitan Borough Council, both currently from the Labour Party. In 2011 it had a population of 10,011. The ward was formed in 2015.
