= Thorne & Moorends (ward) =

Electoral ward in Doncaster, England

Coordinates: 53.6111°N 0.9615°W

- Ward
- Location within South Yorkshire
- Area: 47.00 km^{2} (18.15 sq mi)
- Population: 17,295 (2011)
  - Density: 368/km^{2} (950/sq mi)
- Metropolitan borough: Doncaster
- Metropolitan county: South Yorkshire
- Region: Yorkshire and the Humber
- Country: England
- Sovereign state: United Kingdom
- UK Parliament: Doncaster East and the Isle of Axholme
- Councillors: Susan Durant (Labour); Mark Houlbrook (Labour); Joe Blackham (Labour)

Thorne & Moorends—consisting of the town of Thorne, plus Moorends and Waterside—is one of 21 electoral wards in the Metropolitan Borough of Doncaster, South Yorkshire, England. Thorne and Moorends elect three councillors to Doncaster Metropolitan Borough Council currently held by Labour. In 2011 it had a population of 17,295. The ward was formed in 2015.
