= Micklebring =

Village in South Yorkshire, England

Coordinates: 53.445°N 1.223°W

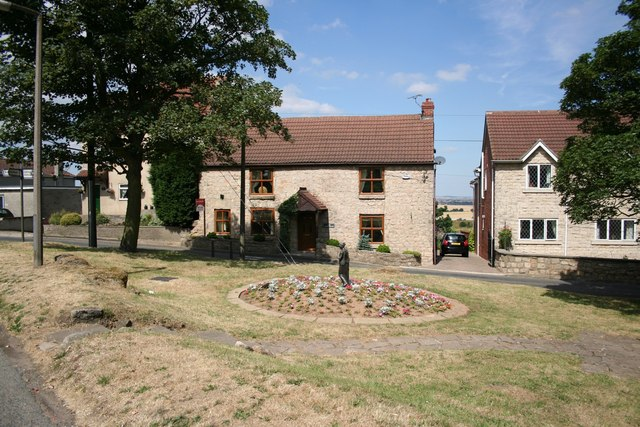
Cottages in Micklebring

Micklebring is a small village in the civil parish of Braithwell, South Yorkshire, to the south-west of Doncaster.

Coronation Street star Bill Waddington (Percy Sugden) was a former resident.

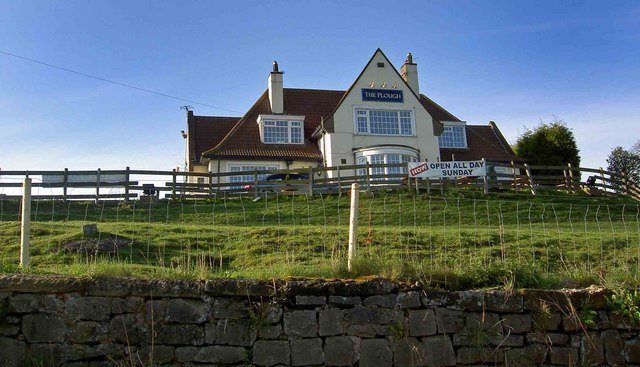
The Plough public house

The Plough Inn is in Micklebring.

== See also ==
- Listed buildings in Braithwell
