= Doncaster (St. James' Bridge) railway station =

Former railway station in England

Doncaster (St. James' Bridge)

General information
- Location: Hexthorpe, Doncaster; England
- Coordinates: 53.517700°N 1.140610°W
- Grid reference: SE571027
- Platforms: 1

Other information
- Status: Disused

History
- Post-grouping: London and North Eastern Railway

Key dates
- by September 1933: opened
- September 1946: closed
Location

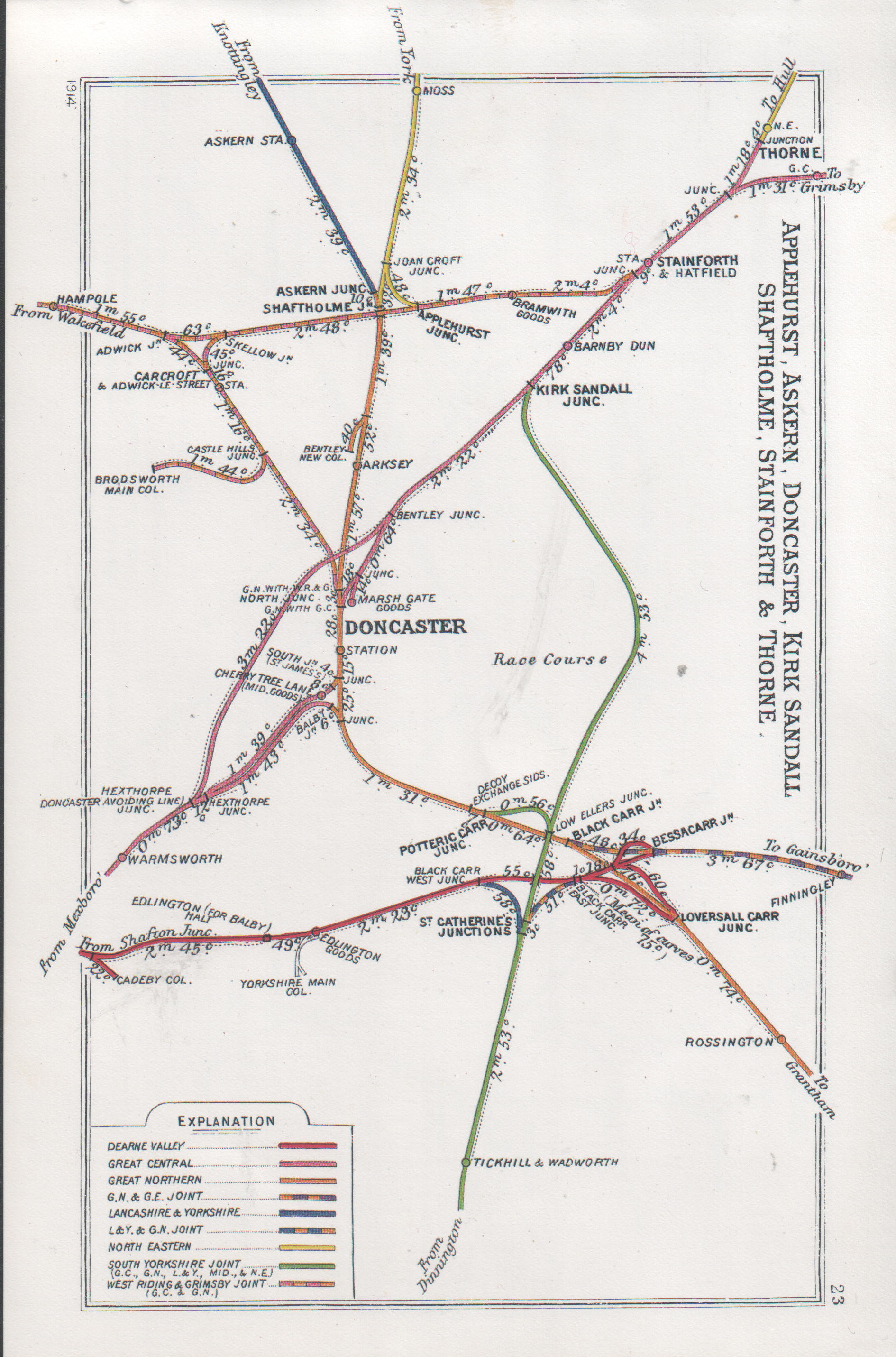
Railway Clearing House diagram showing lines around Doncaster in 1914.

Doncaster (St. James' Bridge) railway station was situated in the Hexthorpe area of Doncaster, South Yorkshire, England and was accessed from St. James' Bridge, the main road link between Doncaster town centre and the railway community of Hexthorpe. The station was a little nearer Doncaster than the South Yorkshire Railway's Doncaster (Cherry Tree Lane) railway station being less than a mile south of the main station, adjacent to the Sheffield line.

The station, which consisted of a single island platform, was built by the LNER to serve excursion traffic, principally that bringing visitors to the town in connection with the St. Leger horse racing festival held each September although it was also used for seaside excursions leaving (or passing through) the town heading for the east coast, principally to Cleethorpes. (Those not required to stop would usually be routed via the Doncaster Avoiding Line due to pressure of space). This station, adjacent to carriage sidings where incoming trains could be stored also relieved the pressure of platform space in the town's main station.

Access was by a substantial wooden ramp, stepped on one side, plain slope for cyclists on the other, from St. James' Bridge, a favourite place for trainspotters with views over the East Coast Main Line and the Sheffield bound line. Platform facilities were minimal and consisted of a small office, used by the staff which came from the main station as needed.

Because the station never had a regular timetabled service it did not appear in timetables, only in "Special Traffic Notices" when it was to be used. This also means that closure notices were not required when it was no longer needed by the demands of traffic and an official closure date not recorded. The station platforms were not removed on closure and were in situ until changes were made to the track layout in the area in the late 1990s.
