= Roman Ridge (ward) =

Electoral ward in Doncaster, England

Coordinates: 53.5375°N 1.1699°W

- Ward
- Location within South Yorkshire
- Area: 5.82 km^{2} (2.25 sq mi)
- Population: 11,229 (2011)
  - Density: 1,929/km^{2} (5,000/sq mi)
- Metropolitan borough: Doncaster
- Metropolitan county: South Yorkshire
- Region: Yorkshire and the Humber
- Country: England
- Sovereign state: United Kingdom
- UK Parliament: Doncaster North
- Councillors: Howard Rimmer (Reform); Craig Ward (Reform)

Roman Ridge—consisting of Cusworth, Scawsby and part of Scawthorpe—is one of 21 electoral wards in the Metropolitan Borough of Doncaster, South Yorkshire, England. It forms part of the Doncaster North parliamentary constituency. It elects 2 councillors to Doncaster Metropolitan Borough Council. The ward is named after the Roman Ridge, a bridleway that was an ancient Roman road. In 2011 it had a population of 11,229. The ward was formed in 2015.
