= Hexthorpe railway platform =

Former railway station in South Yorkshire, England

Hexthorpe platform
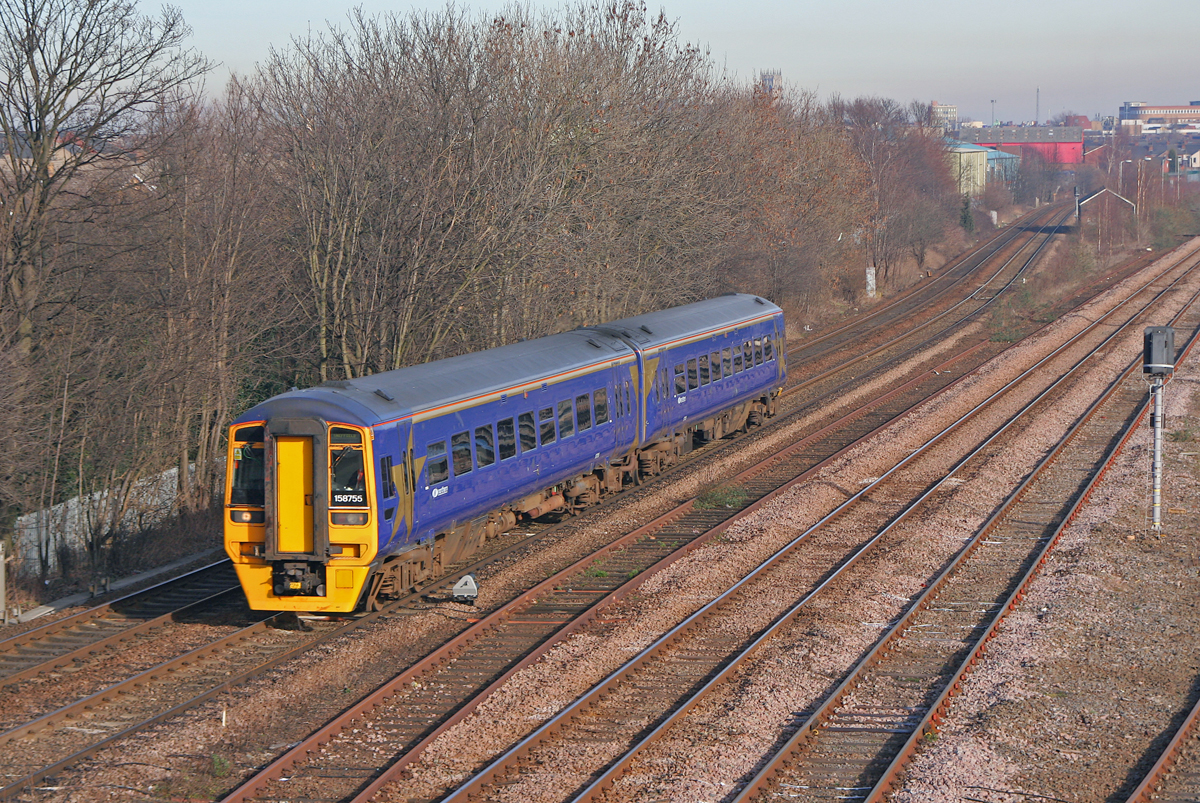
- Train passing the approximate location of the former halt

General information
- Location: Hexthorpe, Doncaster; England
- Coordinates: 53.5119°N 1.1537°W
- Grid reference: SE562020
- Platforms: 1

Other information
- Status: Disused

History
- Opened: 1 February 1850
- Closed: 1855
Location

Hexthorpe railway platform was a short, wooden railway platform on the South Yorkshire Railway line about 1 1/2 miles (2.4 km) west of Doncaster in the area known as Hexthorpe Flatts, just on the Doncaster side of the road bridge. The platform was situated on the Doncaster – bound line and was normally used for the collection of tickets particularly on the days of the St. Leger race meeting.

== 1887 accident ==
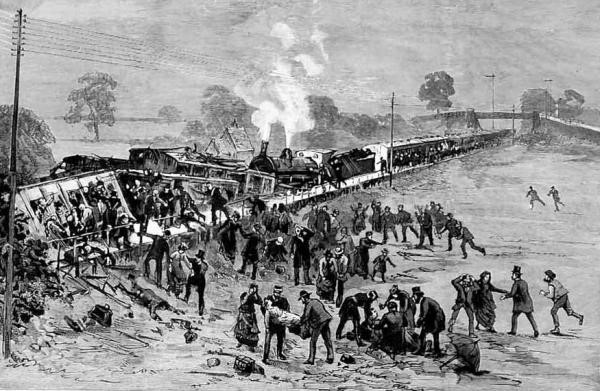
Rail accident 1887

On 16 September 1887 the platform was the scene of a tragic railway accident. The Hexthorpe rail accident was one of a series of accidents which occurred in the "Battle of the Brakes", a period when railway managements were in dispute over the type of brake, if any, which should be used on passenger trains. The death toll reached 25 and 66 were injured.
