= Harold Walker, Baron Walker of Doncaster =

English politician (1927–2003)

The Right Honourable The Lord Walker of Doncaster PC DL
- Walker as Deputy Speaker chairing the Budget debate, March 1990

Deputy Speaker of the House of Commons Chairman of Ways and Means
- In office 23 June 1983 – 6 May 1992
- Speaker: Bernard Weatherill
- Preceded by: Bernard Weatherill
- Succeeded by: Michael Morris

Minister of State for Employment
- In office 14 April 1976 – 4 May 1979
- Prime Minister: James Callaghan
- Preceded by: Albert Booth
- Succeeded by: The Earl of Gowrie

Member of the House of Lords
- Lord Temporal
- Life peerage 26 September 1997 – 11 November 2003

Member of Parliament for Doncaster Central Doncaster (1964–1983)
- In office 15 October 1964 – 8 April 1997
- Preceded by: Anthony Barber
- Succeeded by: Rosie Winterton

Personal details
- Born: 12 July 1927 Audenshaw, Lancashire, England
- Died: 11 November 2003 (aged 76)
- Party: Labour
- Spouse: Lady Mary Walker [nee Griffin]

Harold Walker, Baron Walker of Doncaster (12 July 1927 – 11 November 2003) was an English Labour politician.

Born in Audenshaw, Walker was educated at Manchester College of Technology and became a toolmaker. He served in the Royal Navy's Fleet Air Arm and was a lecturer for the National Council of Labour Colleges.

Walker was elected Member of Parliament for Doncaster (after 1983 Doncaster Central) at the 1964 general election. He was a junior whip and then junior employment minister in the first Harold Wilson government, and continued being spokesman on employment in opposition, returning to the ministry in 1974. He was Minister of State at the Department of Employment 1976-79 and he became a Privy Counsellor in 1979. When Labour lost the election that year, Walker became the opposition spokesman for employment and training.

Walker left the employment brief in 1983 following that year's general election, and became Chairman of Ways and Means & Deputy Speaker to Bernard Weatherill. He did not, however, become Speaker when Weatherill retired in 1992, that honour instead going to Betty Boothroyd. He was knighted that year and returned to the backbenches until his retirement.

Walker retired in 1997 and was created a life peer as Baron Walker of Doncaster, of Audenshaw in the County of Greater Manchester on 26 September 1997. In 1998 he became a deputy lieutenant of South Yorkshire and Honorary Freeman of Doncaster.

Walker died in November 2003, aged 76.

Parliament of the United Kingdom
Preceded by Anthony Barber	Member of Parliament for Doncaster; 1964–1983	Constituency abolished
New constituency	Member of Parliament for Doncaster Central; 1983–1997	Succeeded by Rosie Winterton
Preceded by Bernard Weatherill	Chairman of Ways and Means; 1983 – 1992	Succeeded by Michael Morris
