= Listed buildings in Braithwell =

Braithwell is a civil parish in the metropolitan borough of Doncaster, South Yorkshire, England. The ward contains 15 listed buildings that are recorded in the National Heritage List for England. Of these, one is listed at Grade II*, the middle of the three grades, and the others are at Grade II, the lowest grade. The parish contains the villages of Braithwell and Micklebring and the surrounding area. The listed buildings include houses and associated structures, the ruins of a medieval house, a church, memorials in the churchyard, a village cross, a milestone, and a war memorial.

== Key ==
Grade	Criteria
II*	Particularly important buildings of more than special interest
II	Buildings of national importance and special interest

== Buildings ==
Name and location	Photograph	Date	Notes	Grade
St James' Church; 53.44642°N 1.20356°W		12th century	The church was altered and extended through the centuries, the chancel was rebuilt in 1845, and the organ chamber added in 1894. It is built in magnesian limestone with some sandstone and limestone, and has roofs of Welsh slate and stone slate. The church consists of a nave, a south aisle, a south porch, a chancel, a north organ chamber and vestry, and a west tower. The tower is in Perpendicular style, and has three stages, a three-light west window, three-light bell openings, and an embattled parapet with eight crocketed pinnacles. The porch has a square-headed doorway with a keystone, above which is a dated and inscribed sundial. The body of the church also has embattled parapets, and the east window has three lights, and contains Decorated tracery.	II*
Village Cross; 53.44404°N 1.20221°W		Late 12th or early 13th century	The cross is mounted on an island at a crossroads, and was restored in 1887 and in 1953. It is in magnesian limestone, and stands on a square plinth of three steps, the lower step chamfered and inscribed. The cross has a square base and a projecting band, on the base is an inscribed plaque, and above it is a square shaft.	II
Remains of Moat Hall; 53.44343°N 1.19684°W	—	1427	The remains of a medieval house on a moated site are in magnesian limestone. What remains are fragments of walling, and a chamfered pointed arch.	II
Dovecote; 53.44642°N 1.20553°W	—	17th century	The dovecote to the west of Manor House, which was altered in the 19th century, is in magnesian limestone with repairs in brick, and has quoins, stone slate eaves courses, and a pantile roof with shaped kneelers and the remains of gable copings. There are two storeys and two bays. On the west front is a square-headed opening, an infilled archway over a stable door, stone steps, and a casement window. On the right return is a ledge forming a hood over a two-light window. Inside are stone nesting holes.	II
Manor House, Micklebring; 53.44740°N 1.22380°W		1677	A farmhouse in magnesian limestone, it has quoins, and a roof of Welsh slate and pantile, with coped gables. There are three storeys, three bays and a rear wing on the left. The central doorway has a quoined surround, a deep lintel, and a hood mould. The windows in the lower two floors are mullioned, the window above the doorway with a hood mould, and the windows in the top floor are casements.	II
Hall Farm and Old Hall Farm; 53.44362°N 1.20209°W	—	1683	The older part is Hall Farmhouse built in 1683, adjacent and attached to Old Hall Farmhouse, which was added in 1771. The building is in magnesian limestone, both parts have quoins, and the roofs are in Welsh slate. Hall Farmhouse has two storeys and two bays, a chamfered plinth, and a doorway with a quoined surround, a lintel with a keystone, and a hood mould. Above the doorway is a dated and initialled plaque, and most of the windows are mullioned, with hood moulds. Old Hall Farmhouse has three storeys and three bays, and a hipped roof. Its doorway also has a quoined surround and a keystone, and above it is a dated and initialled plaque. The windows are casements.	II
Old School House; 53.44513°N 1.20191°W	—	1693	The school house, later used for other purposes, is in limestone, with rusticated quoins, a floor band, and a pantile roof with moulded gable copings and shaped kneelers. There are two storeys, two bays, and a single-storey rear wing on the left. The central doorway has a chamfered surround, the windows on the front are sashes, and above the doorway is an inscribed and dated plaque. On the right return is a sundial with an iron gnomon and a shield, and in the rear wing are casement windows.	II
Three chest tombs 53.44619°N 1.20377°W	—	1727	The chest tombs are in the churchyard of St James' Church, and are in sandstone. The tomb nearest the church, dated 1773, has a moulded plinth and square corner balusters supporting an inscribed slab with a moulded edge. The next tomb, dated 1727, has a plinth, ribbed side-panels, and a moulded edge to an inscribed slab, and the furthest tomb, dated 1820, has re-entrant corners with columns, oval panels on each side with foliate corner motifs, and an inscription on the north side.	II
Grave slab 53.44634°N 1.20349°W	—	1728	The grave slab is in the churchyard of St James' Church, and is to the memory of members of the Sheppard and Jubb families. It is in sandstone, and consists of a rectangular slab with well-preserved inscriptions.	II
Milestone; 53.44409°N 1.20238°W		18th century (probable)	The milestone by a wall near a crossroad, is in magnesian limestone. It consists of a short pillar with a square section, and is inscribed with the distance to Rotherham.	II
Rotherwood; 53.44423°N 1.20159°W	—	18th century (probable)	The house, which was refronted in the early 19th century, is in limestone, and has a Welsh slate roof with gable copings and shaped kneelers. There are two storeys and three bays. The central doorway has plinth blocks and a fanlight, and the windows are sashes with lintels grooved as voussoirs.	II
Gate piers, Old Hall Farmhouse; 53.44389°N 1.20212°W	—	1771 (probable)	The gate piers are in magnesian limestone. They are square in section, and each pier is surmounted by a concave plinth and a ball finial.	II
Headstone; 53.44620°N 1.20388°W	—	1784	The headstone is in the churchyard of St James' Church, and is to the memory of Anne Brook and her children. It is in sandstone, and consists of an upright rectangular slab, and has an inscription in an arcaded panel with a ribbed keystone, and sunken spandrels with a vase and foliage.	II
Manor House, Braithwell; 53.44625°N 1.20439°W	—	1830–40	A large house in sandstone, partly rendered, on a chamfered plinth, it has a Welsh slate roof with chamfered gable copings, shaped kneelers, and apex finials. There are two storeys and attics, and three gabled bays. The middle bay is recessed, and has a gabled porch with an arched entrance, a hood mould, and a plaque with a shield. The windows are casements with mullions, chamfered surrounds and hood moulds. At the rear, the middle bay projects under a shaped gable, and there are transomed windows with Tudor arched lights.	II
War memorial 53.44628°N 1.20188°W	—	1921–22	The war memorial is in an enclosure by a road junction. It is in Portland stone, and is in the form of a Saxon cross. It stands on rectangular steps and has a base inscribed with the names of those lost in the First World War. On the shaft is an inscription and above is a Sword of Remembrance carved in relief.	II
