= Hexthorpe rail accident =

1887 railway incident in England

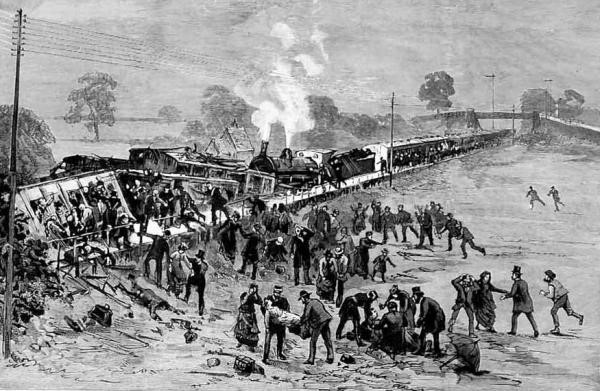

Details
- Date: 16 September 1887
- Location: Hexthorpe railway platform
- Coordinates: 53.5119°N 1.1537°W
- Country: England, UK
- Line: South Yorkshire Railway
- Incident type: Collision
- Cause: Driver's error

Statistics
- Trains: 2
- Deaths: 25

The Hexthorpe rail accident occurred on 16 September 1887 at Hexthorpe railway platform some 1 1/2 miles (2.4 km) west of Doncaster on the South Yorkshire Railway line to Sheffield and Barnsley. The platform was situated within a block section between Hexthorpe Junction and Cherry Tree Lane and so had no signals of its own. The railway platform was a simple wooden structure on the Doncaster - bound line usually used for the collection of tickets from the many trains arriving in the town for the St. Leger race meeting.

== History ==
The usual method of working the 1 1/2-mile (2.4 km) section of line was to pass trains from Hexthorpe Junction under a 'permissive' block ruling, however, between the 14 and 16 of September, the block working was suspended and signalling was under the control of two flagmen spaced between the junction box and the ticket platform. On this day two trains were in the section, the first, a Midland Railway train, stood at the platform, the second, another Midland train waiting just to its rear. As the first train moved off the second moved onto the platform so that tickets could be checked.

The third train was a Liverpool to Hull express worked by a MS&LR crew and probably the crew who should have understood the working of the line better than any other. This train came over Hexthorpe Junction with, first the 'distant' signal and then the 'home' signal at danger. With speed down to a crawl the 'home' signal was lowered, the driver assumed, wrongly, that with no other fixed signals to Cherry Tree Lane his route was clear and speed gradually rose. In the official report it was said that the first of the flagmen gave no indication and the second gave an ambiguous signal which was seen by the fireman but not properly understood. The express was reported travelling between 15 miles per hour (24.1 km/h) when they rounded the curve and saw the Midland train still in the platform. The driver applied the 'simple' vacuum brake and threw the locomotive into reverse but could not stop within the short distance of less than 250 yards (229 m). The crash killed 25 and injured 60; many of those trapped in the wreck were jammed in by collapsed woodwork of the carriages, and had to be hacked free.

An inquest held soon after the crash determined that the driver and fireman were to blame. The trial of the driver and fireman at York, before the Lord Chief Justice was the first big legal case in which the newly formed trade union A.S.L.E.F. were part and for which they engaged eminent counsel to defend their members. The jury returned a verdict of 'not guilty' and the Lord Chief Justice said in his summing up that ".....he could not but think that the railway company was seriously to blame for having had in use a brake which not only was not the best in existence, but which was known to be insufficient and liable to break down". The management were "thick skinned" over all safety matters and in this case Sir Edward Watkin, the company chairman, said "....it was a misfortune that the Lord Chief Justice should have exonerated the driver and fireman". Regardless of Sir Edward's thinking the Hexthorpe accident, closely followed by the Armagh rail disaster in Northern Ireland sounded the death knell of the 'simple' vacuum brake.

All of the company's employees offered to give up one week's wage to offset the cost of the accident. This was politely turned down by the company who "declined the offer with thanks, saying that they did not consider it consistent with their duty to tax to such an extent those who lived by the sweat of their brow."
