= Intake, Doncaster =

Suburb of Doncaster, South Yorkshire, England

Coordinates: 53.5273°N 1.1006°W

Intake
- Location within Borough of Doncaster Location within South Yorkshire
- Population: 10,994
- Metropolitan borough: Doncaster
- Metropolitan county: South Yorkshire
- Region: Yorkshire and the Humber
- Country: England
- Sovereign state: United Kingdom
- Post town: Doncaster
- Postcode district: DN2
- Dialling code: 01302
- Police: South Yorkshire
- Fire: South Yorkshire
- Ambulance: Yorkshire
- UK Parliament: Doncaster Central

Intake is a suburb of Doncaster in South Yorkshire, England. The area borders Town Fields, a large area of public land based on Town Moor Avenue. It contains 'Town Moor' which is part of the Intake electoral ward, although 'Town Fields' is a local Doncaster Council administrative area which encompasses the Town Moor district. The Town Fields area comprises private housing built up to the 1930s. Intake is largely a council estate built on the edge of Doncaster during the prosperous 1950s & 1960s. Intake is also home to Sandall Beat Woods.
