= Madge Adam =

English astronomer

- Born: Madge Gertrude Adam; 6 March 1912; London, England
- Died: 25 August 2001 (aged 89)
- Education: Doncaster High School, St Hugh's College, Oxford, Lady Margaret Hall

Madge Gertrude Adam (6 March 1912 – 25 August 2001) was an English solar astronomer who was the first postgraduate student in solar physics at the University of Oxford observatory.

== Early life and education ==
Adam was born the youngest of three children near Highbury, North London, where her father was a teacher at Drayton Park School. With the start of World War I, he enlisted and was killed in action at Ypres in 1918 causing her mother and siblings to relocate to Yorkshire to live with her mother's parents. She became ill at the age of nine and spent a year at the Liverpool Open-Air Hospital to treat her skeletal tuberculosis of an elbow and rickets.

On her release from hospital, Adam won a scholarship to Doncaster High School in South Yorkshire, where she gained a life-long passion for science and mathematics. In 1931, she enrolled in St Hugh's College, Oxford with a scholarship in physics, becoming "the first woman to achieve a first in physics at Oxford". There she gained an MA followed by a D.Phil. from Lady Margaret Hall.

== Career ==
When a new director of the Oxford observatory, who had just installed the university's first solar telescope, announced his research program in solar physics, Adam (who had just earned a first in physics) knocked on his door and said, "How about me?" By joining the research team, she became the first postgraduate student and solar physicist at the university's observatory. Over the years, she became a key figure there for the remainder of her life, eventually becoming acting director during World War II after the director left to work on aircraft production. She became permanent assistant director thereafter and took over the observatory's financial accounts.

She was appointed an assistant tutor at St. Hugh's, and also "taught astronomy courses, with an emphasis on astronavigation, to Royal Navy and RAF cadets".

She was "internationally known for her work on the nature of sunspots and on their magnetic fields." She was a lecturer at the University of Oxford in the Department of Astrophysics from 1937–1979, and was a fellow of the Royal Astronomical Society from 11 March 1938.

== Selected publications ==
- ADAM, Madge Gertrude. Interferometric Measurements of Solar Wave-Lengths and an Investigation of the Einstein Gravitational Displacement.(Reprinted from the Monthly Notices of the Astronomical Society.). Taylor & Francis, 1948.
- Adam, Madge Gertrude. "A new determination of the centre to limb change in solar wave-lengths." Monthly Notices of the Royal Astronomical Society 119.5 (1959): 460-474.
- Adam, Madge G., and H. Bondi. "The observational tests of gravitation theory." Proceedings of the Royal Society of London. Series A. Mathematical and Physical Sciences 270.1342 (1962): 297-305.
- Adam, Madge G. "Discussion of the results obtained by three tests of Einstein's relativity theory made on astronomical bodies from 1918 to 1960." PROCEEDINGS, SERIES A 270 (1962): 297-304.
- Adam, Madge Gertrude. "Line contours in sunspot regions." Monthly Notices of the Royal Astronomical Society 136.1 (1967): 71-90.
