= Norton & Askern (ward) =

Electoral ward in Doncaster, England

Coordinates: 53.6159°N 1.1518°W

- Ward
- Location within South Yorkshire
- Area: 96.17 km^{2} (37.13 sq mi)
- Population: 15,198 (2011)
  - Density: 158/km^{2} (410/sq mi)
- Metropolitan borough: Doncaster
- Metropolitan county: South Yorkshire
- Region: Yorkshire and the Humber
- Country: England
- Sovereign state: United Kingdom
- UK Parliament: Doncaster North
- Councillors: Austen White (Labour); Iris Beech (Labour); Thomas Noon (Conservative)

Norton & Askern—consisting of the town of Askern, Braithwaite, Burghwallis, Campsall, Fenwick, Fishlake, Fosterhouses, Kirk Bramwith, Moss, Norton, Owston, Sutton, Sykehouse, Thorpe in Balne and part of Skellow—is one of 21 electoral wards in the Metropolitan Borough of Doncaster, South Yorkshire, England. It forms part of the Doncaster North parliamentary constituency. It elects three councillors to Doncaster Metropolitan Borough Council; as of April 2023, one of these is Conservative and two are Labour. In 2011 it had a population of 15,198. The ward was formed in 2015.
