= Sally Jameson =

British politician

Sally Jameson MP
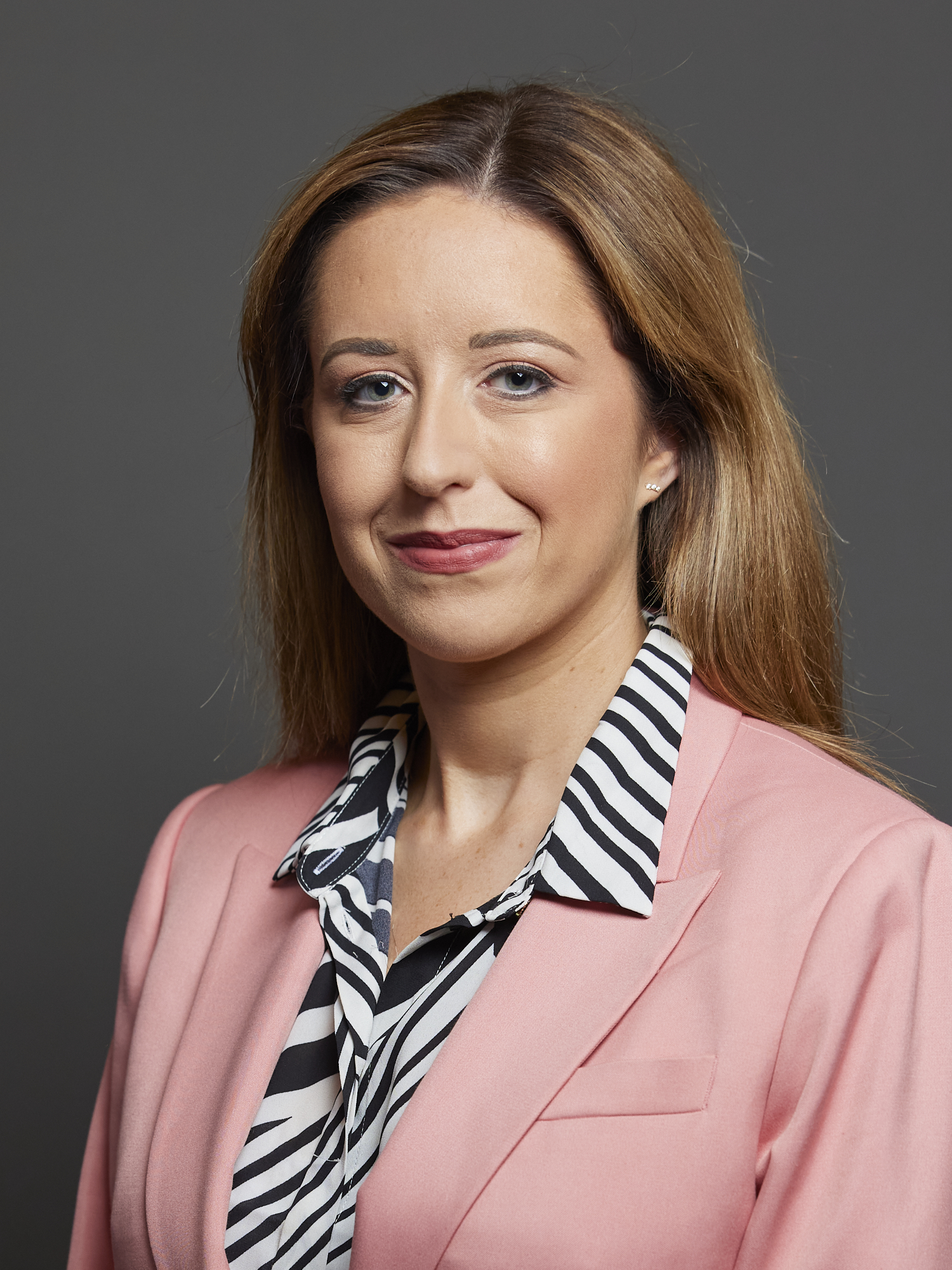
- Official portrait, 2024

Parliamentary Secretary for the Cabinet Office
- Incumbent
- Assumed office 22 July 2026
- Prime Minister: Andy Burnham

Parliamentary Under-Secretary of State at the Ministry of Housing, Communities and Local Government
- Incumbent
- Assumed office 22 July 2026
- Prime Minister: Andy Burnham

Member of Parliament for Doncaster Central
- Incumbent
- Assumed office 4 July 2024
- Preceded by: Dame Rosie Winterton
- Majority: 9,551 (25.2%)

Personal details
- Born: Sally Anne Jameson Doncaster, England
- Party: Labour
- Occupation: Politician

Sally Anne Jameson is a British politician. A member of the Labour Party, she has ben a Member of Parliament (MP) for Doncaster Central since 2024.

== Early life and career ==
Jameson was born and raised in Doncaster. She was a prison officer at a local prison and was a branch chair of the Prison Officers' Association union.

== Politics ==
Jameson campaigned for Labour for 12 years before being elected, and was an agent for the previous MP Rosie Winterton. She was selected to stand in the 2024 general election for Doncaster Central, in July 2022. She was endorsed by Unison, ASLEF, Co-operative Party and USDAW. She won the seat with a majority of 9,551.

In December 2024, Jameson was Parliamentary Private Secretary to the Ministry of Justice. She has served as Parliamentary Private Secretary to the Home Office. She called on Prime Minister Keir Starmer to resign in May 2026. She was appointed as Parliamentary Under-Secretary of State jointly in the Cabinet Office and Ministry of Housing, Communities and Local Government on 22 July 2026 by new prime minister Andy Burnham.

Parliament of the United Kingdom
Preceded by Dame Rosie Winterton	Member of Parliament for Doncaster Central; 2024–present	Incumbent
