= Town Fields =

Coordinates: 53.52464°N 1.11438°W

- Neighbourhood
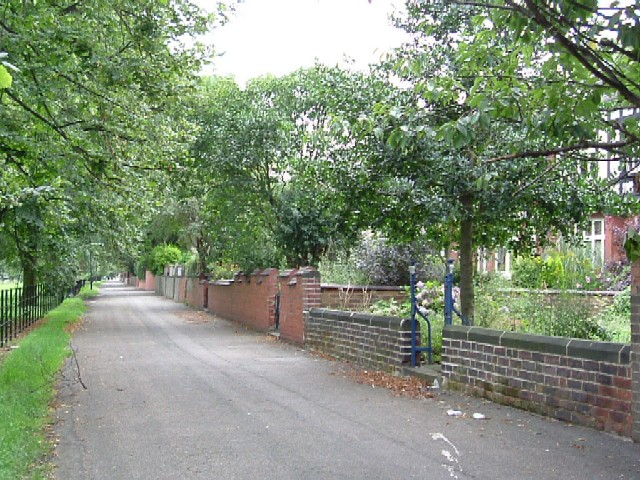
- Town Field Villas

- Location within City of Doncaster Location within South Yorkshire
  - London: 145 mi (233 km) SSE
- Metropolitan borough: City of Doncaster
- Metropolitan county: South Yorkshire
- Region: Yorkshire and the Humber
- Country: England
- Sovereign state: United Kingdom
- Post town: DONCASTER
- Postcode district: DN2
- Dialling code: 01302
- Police: South Yorkshire
- Fire: South Yorkshire
- Ambulance: Yorkshire
- UK Parliament: Doncaster Central

Town Fields, or Town Field, is a large public park in Doncaster, South Yorkshire, England. The name also refers to the neighbourhood surrounding the park, situated immediately east of the city centre.

Facilities include a multi-use games area, sports pitches, Doncaster Town Cricket Club, Doncaster Squash Club and Doncaster Hockey Club. Town Field Primary School is on the western edge of the park. It was historically used by the adjacent Hall Cross School.

== Association with George Boole ==
The mathematician and logician George Boole worked as an assistant teacher at Heigham's School in Doncaster from 1831 to 1833. Susan Blackmore writes that, while walking on Town Fields during this period, Boole had a sudden insight that mathematical principles might be used to explain the "laws of thought".
