= Edlington & Warmsworth (ward) =

Electoral ward in Doncaster, England

Coordinates: 53.4787°N 1.1933°W

- Ward
- Location within South Yorkshire
- Area: 10.71 km^{2} (4.14 sq mi)
- Population: 11,743 (2011)
  - Density: 1,096/km^{2} (2,840/sq mi)
- Metropolitan borough: Doncaster
- Metropolitan county: South Yorkshire
- Region: Yorkshire and the Humber
- Country: England
- Sovereign state: United Kingdom
- UK Parliament: Don Valley
- Councillors: Phil Cole (Labour); Rob Reid (Edlington & Warmsworth First)

Edlington & Warmsworth—consisting of the town of Edlington, Old Edlington and Warmsworth—is one of 21 electoral wards in the Metropolitan Borough of Doncaster, South Yorkshire, England. It forms part of the Don Valley parliamentary constituency. In 2011 it had a population of 11,743.
