= Rossington & Bawtry (ward) =

Electoral ward in Doncaster, England

Coordinates: 53.4283°N 1.0214°W

- Ward
- Location within South Yorkshire
- Area: 31.79 km^{2} (12.27 sq mi)
- Population: 17,646 (2011)
  - Density: 555/km^{2} (1,440/sq mi)
- Metropolitan borough: Doncaster
- Metropolitan county: South Yorkshire
- Region: Yorkshire and the Humber
- Country: England
- Sovereign state: United Kingdom
- UK Parliament: Doncaster East and the Isle of Axholme
- Councillors: Lee Joseph Sammut(Labour); Bob Anderson (Labour); Ken Guest (Labour)

Rossington & Bawtry—consisting of Austerfield, Bawtry and Rossington—is one of 21 electoral wards in the Metropolitan Borough of Doncaster, South Yorkshire, England. In 2011 it had a population of 17,646. The ward was formed in 2015.
