= Hall Cross Academy =

- Hall Cross Academy Logo

Location
- Thorne Road; Doncaster, South Yorkshire, DN1 2HY; England
- Coordinates: 53°31′23″N 01°07′28″W

Information
- Type: Academy
- Motto: Confort et liesse -Welfare and Jubilation
- Specialist: Science
- Department for Education URN: 137842 Tables
- Ofsted: Reports
- Age: 11 to 18
- Enrolment: 1911
- Capacity: 2263
- Former pupils: Old Danensians
- Former names: Doncaster Grammar School, Hall Cross Comprehensive School
- Website: http://www.hallcrossacademy.co.uk

Hall Cross Academy (formerly Hall Cross School and Doncaster Grammar School), is a co-educational academy in Doncaster, South Yorkshire, England. The 2012–2013 term saw the establishment change its name to Hall Cross Academy. It is named after the Hall Cross on Hall Cross Hill, on the opposite side of the main road through Doncaster.

== Academic performance ==
GCSE results for the school are slightly above average. At A-level it performs well, with some of the best results in South Yorkshire, and the third best in Doncaster LEA. Results in Doncaster at GCSE are notably low, but they are much better at A level, similar to the situation in Grimsby and Hull.

== Admissions ==
The academy is split over two sites, with the Upper academy located in the centre of Doncaster (in the Town Fields area) and the Lower academy in the north of Bessacarr, near the Dome. Hall Cross Academy has specialist status as a Science College. The total number of pupils who attend the academy is over 2000. It features as an integral part of the community, providing access to facilities for many primary schools, which also form part of its large catchment area. The headteacher of the academy is Mr Simon Swain.

== The Gilbert Scott building and Christchurch House ==
The Gilbert Scott building is the oldest building on the Town Centre site, it was designed by Sir George Gilbert Scott and was built in 1869. Downstairs it features a plaque dedicating the building to Queen Victoria. The upper floor houses the school's library and an IT suite. The building is a classic example of Victorian Gothic Revival, featuring a large Hammerbeam roof decorated with flowers cut into the massive oak beams which may, in fact, be stained pine. The building also features a tower at one corner. Inside the library there are two massive Gothic-style glass windows at either end, one of them being stained glass, designed and executed by former pupil C. Rupert Moore, which was unveiled in 1938 as a tribute to "Old Boys" from the school who died in World War I. The library features a large number of Victorian plaques, dedicated to past headteachers of the school as well as to staff and students killed in the two world wars. The most recent plaque commemorates the visit by Prince Charles to the school in 1989.

Christchurch house is the school's equivalent of a "6th form block". It is a large detached Victorian Townhouse which overlooks the local church that the house is named after. The house features a grand wooden staircase, stained glass skylights, and a statue of the Venus de Milo which originally resided in the Girls' School, built in 1918. When the school was disbanded, the statue was moved to Hall Cross Academy.

== Remembrance Day ==
Remembrance Day is one of the most important days in the academic calendar. The academy has held a ceremony every year since 1918 to remember those who attended the school and died in battle. The service begins at 9 am. Speeches are made by the Head Teacher who gives thanks to those who died as a result of conflict. Two poppy wreaths are then carried down the corridor to the library by the Head Boy and Head Girl. They are then laid by the World War One and World War Two plaques respectively, while the Last Post is played on the trumpet, with the sounds carrying through to the library.

== Railways ==
High Speed Train power car no. 43045 was named 'The Grammar School, Doncaster AD1350' in Spring 1984. It was last in revenue earning service with East Midlands Trains and was stored at Long Marston, not carrying its former name.

The nameplate removed from the locomotive was kept in the collection of railwayana originally located in the tower of the academy along with a large collection of amassed by the Doncaster Grammar School Railway Society, to which, at one point, one in six pupils belonged. The collection also includes nameplates from two locomotives destroyed as a result of the Harrow and Wealdstone rail crash. This collection is now in the Railway Heritage Centre of the Danum Museum.

== Old Danensians ==
Alumni and former staff of Doncaster Grammar School, Doncaster High School for Girls, Hall Cross Comprehensive School and Hall Cross Academy, known as Old Danensians, are able to join the Old Danensians' Club.

The object of the club is to maintain connections between past members of the School with one another and the School, and generally promote the welfare of the foundation.

=== Notable faculty members ===
- H. J. Blackham (taught divinity in the early 1930s)
- Squadron Leader Ernest Kinghorn, Labour MP from 1945 to 1951 for Great Yarmouth (taught languages)

=== Alumni ===
==== Hall Cross Comprehensive School ====
- David Firth, animator behind Salad Fingers, the fat-pie website and one half of the cult mockumentary anti-hero, MC Devvo
- Barry Middleton, England international hockey player.
- Louis Tomlinson, singer and songwriter.
- Tan France, fashion designer and television personality, founder of brand Kingdom & State and fashion expert on Queer Eye.
- Lee Cowling, former professional footballer and football coach for Manchester United, Nottingham Forest and Mansfield Town.
- Darius Henderson, former professional footballer for Sheffield United, Watford, Millwall and Nottingham Forest.

==== Doncaster Grammar School for Boys ====
- Edmund Beckett, 1st Baron Grimthorpe (briefly)
- H.J. Blackham, philosopher and humanist
- Rodney Bickerstaffe, former leader of Britain's largest trades union, UNISON.
- Prof Thomas Charlton, Jackson Professor of Engineering from 1970 to 1979 at the University of Aberdeen, and Professor of Civil Engineering from 1963 to 1970 at Queen's University Belfast
- Ronald Dearing, CB, former chairman of the Post Office, chancellor from 1993 to 2000 of the University of Nottingham, and known for the Dearing Report which laid the foundations of tuition fees (top-up fees) at universities.
- Sir Eric Denton CBE, marine biologist, Royal Society Research Professor from 1964 to 1974 at the University of Bristol
- Percy Elland, editor from 1950 to 1959 of the Evening Standard
- Prof Robert Fox, Professor from 1988 to 2006 of the History of Science at the University of Oxford (Linacre College)
- Kevin Marsh, BBC executive, Editor from 2002 to 2006 of the Today programme
- Prof Roger Needham CBE, Professor of Computer Systems from 1981 to 1998 at the University of Cambridge, Head of the University of Cambridge Computer Laboratory from 1980 to 1995, and invented important algorithms (Needham-Schroeder protocol) for computer security
- Rev Prof Christopher Rowland, Dean Ireland's Professor of the Exegesis of Holy Scripture since 1991 at the University of Oxford
- Prof Denis Sargan, Professor of Econometrics from 1964 to 1984 at the London School of Economics (LSE).
- John Scott-Scott, rocket scientist
- Edward Smallwood, Liberal MP from 1917 to 1918 of Islington East

==== Doncaster High School for Girls ====
- Madge Adam, astronomer.
- Margo Gunn, actress
- Jane Harrison, one of four women to have been awarded the George Cross

==== Doncaster Grammar School ====
- Thomas Britten, international footballer (Wales 1878 and 1880)
- John Cartwright, emeritus Professor of the Law of Contract, University of Oxford
- Gillian Coultard, football player, former Captain of the England Woman's football team

== Gallery ==
An external view of the academy

The library, as seen from the balcony

A close up of the stained glass library window

Students at the Thorne Road site, 1887

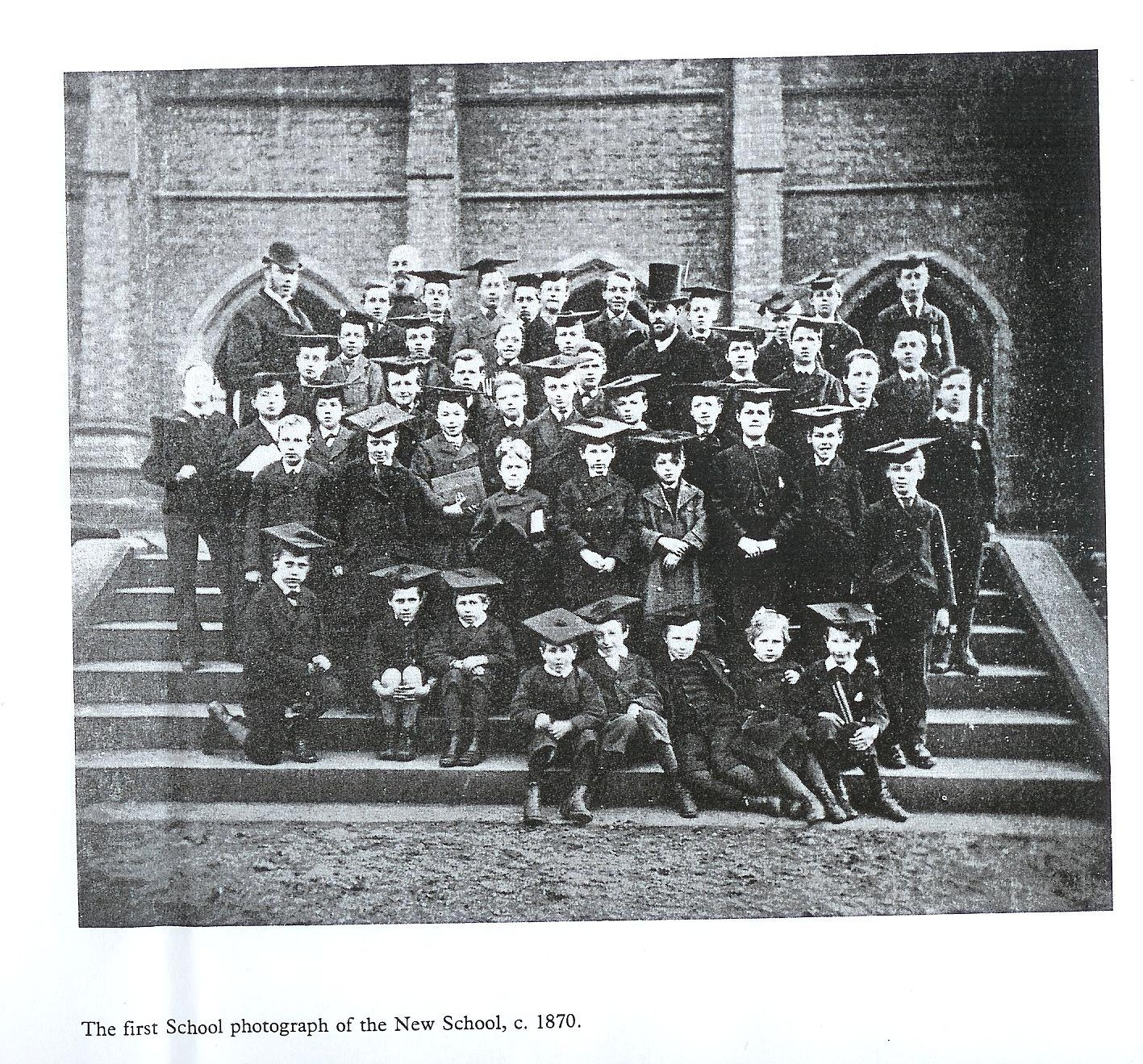
The first students to attend the Thorne Road site, 1870

The original school building, 1869

== See also ==
- List of the oldest schools in the United Kingdom
- Listed buildings in Doncaster (Town Ward)
