= John Cartwright (legal scholar) =

John Cartwright (born 1957) is Emeritus Professor of the Law of Contract at the University of Oxford, and Emeritus Student (Fellow) of Christ Church, and a qualified Solicitor (now not practising). As a student at Oxford between 1977 and 1982 he read Honour Moderations in Classics, the BA in Jurisprudence and the BCL. In 1982 he was appointed an Official Student and Tutor in Law at Christ Church, and Lecturer in the Law Faculty. In 2004 he was appointed Reader in the Law of Contract at the University, and Professor of the Law of Contract in 2008.

Cartwright retired from his posts at the Law Faculty and Christ Church at the end of 2018, but until 2024 he continued to teach at Paris Panthéon-Assas University ('Paris-Panthéon-Assas'), where he had already taught regularly as visiting professor (professeur invité) since 2002. In 2025 Paris-Panthéon-Assas conferred on him the title of Docteur Honoris Causa.

In addition, Cartwright was Professor of Anglo-American Private Law at the University of Leiden from 2007 to 2017.

== Publishing ==
Cartwright has written extensively on English and comparative private law, especially contract law and land law, and he continues to publish in retirement. His publications include:

- Anson's Law of Contract: 32nd edn (jointly with Jack Beatson and Paul Davies): Oxford University Press, 2026
- Misrepresentation, Mistake and Non-Disclosure: 7th edn, Sweet & Maxwell (Contract Law Library), 2025
- Formation and Variation of Contracts: 4th edn, Sweet & Maxwell (Contract Law Library), 2024
- Contract Law: An Introduction to the English Law of Contract for the Civil Lawyer: 4th edn, Hart Publishing, 2023
- Cheshire & Burn's Modern Law of Real Property: 18th edn (jointly with E.H. Burn), Oxford University Press, 2011
