= Doncaster (Cherry Tree Lane) railway station =

Former railway station in England

Doncaster (Cherry Tree Lane)
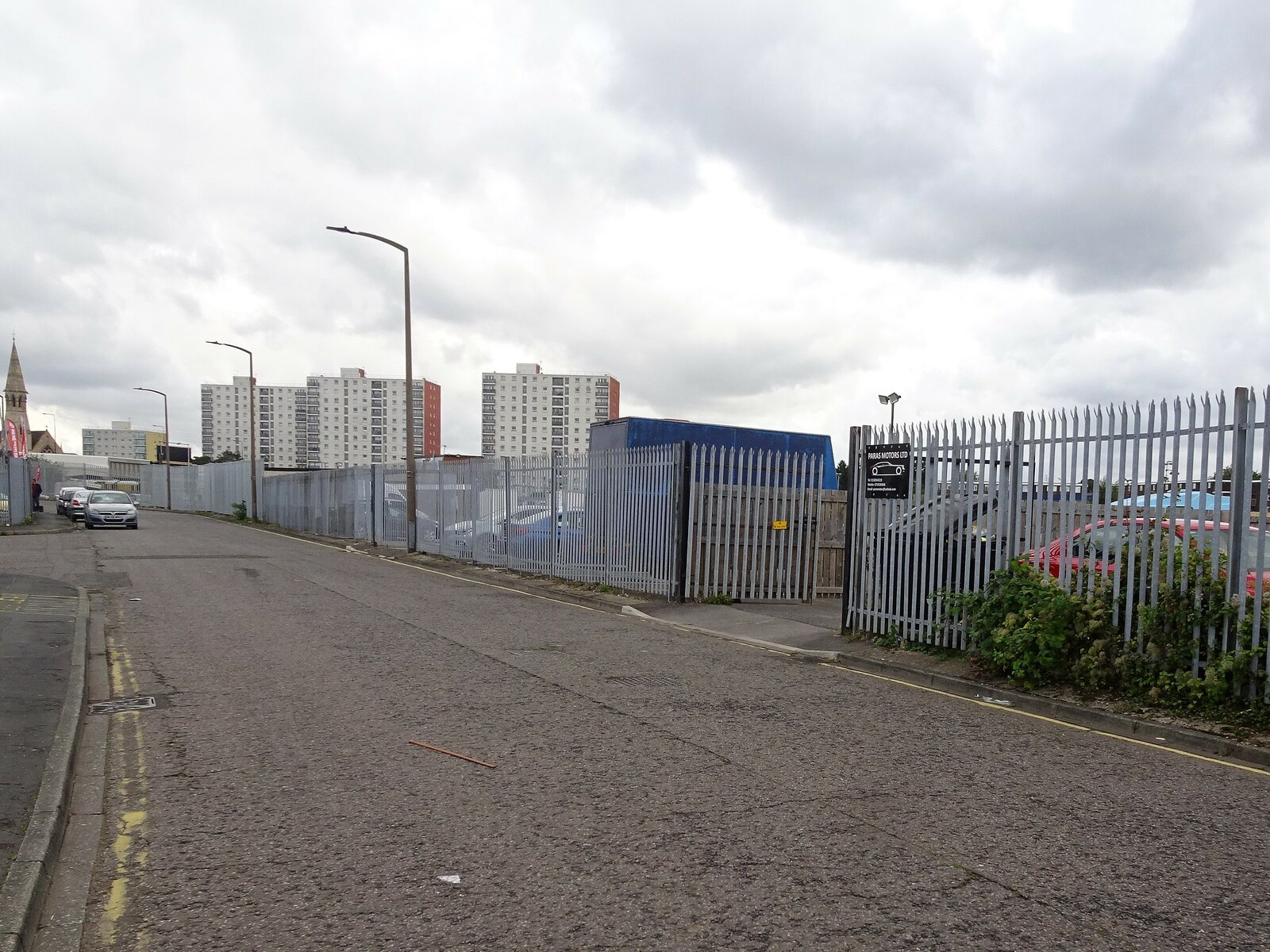
- The site of the station in 2020

General information
- Location: Hexthorpe, Doncaster; England
- Coordinates: 53.517090°N 1.142660°W
- Grid reference: SE569026

Other information
- Status: Disused

History
- Original company: South Yorkshire Railway

Key dates
- 10 November 1849: opened
- c. 1852: closed
Location

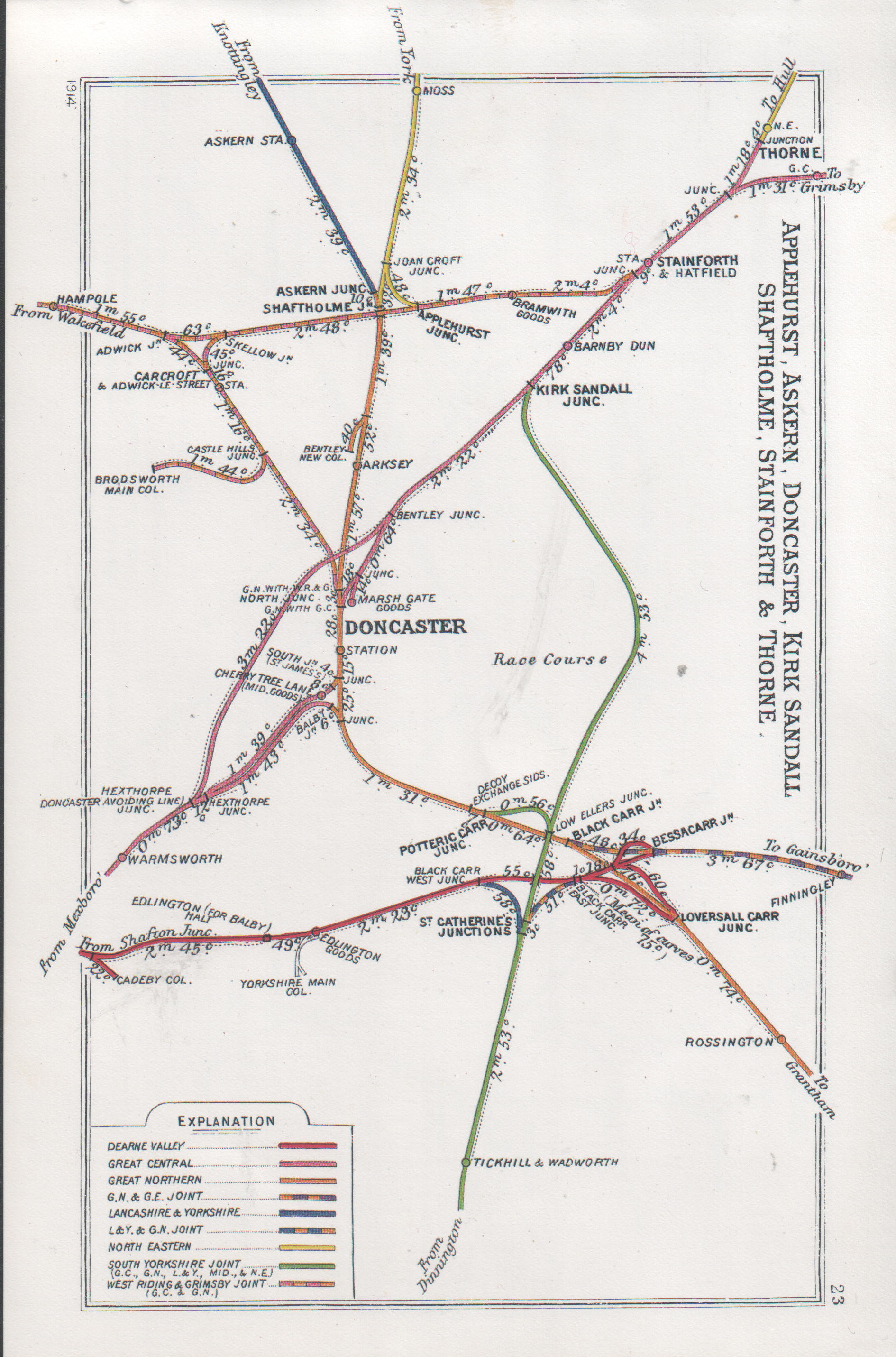
Railway Clearing House diagram showing lines around Doncaster in 1914.

Doncaster (Cherry Tree Lane) railway station was situated in the Hexthorpe district of Doncaster, South Yorkshire, England and was the original terminus of the South Yorkshire Railway.

The station, later to be known simply as "Cherrytree", was used for the first time when a special train, for the inspection of the line to Swinton where it joined the Midland Railway, ran on 29 October 1849 and it was scheduled to open for public use on 3 November of the same year, however this was not to be as some work required to be completed. The actual public opening took place on 10 November.

The station was closed when running powers were agreed between the South Yorkshire Railway and the Great Northern Railway which allowed the SYR to run their passenger trains into the GNR station.

In order to accommodate excursion traffic an island platform station known as St. James' Bridge was built on a site between Cherrytree and the GNR station by the LNER.
