= Fundamental theorem of software engineering =

General principle for managing complexity through abstraction

The fundamental theorem of software engineering is a humorous observation, credited variously to Roger Needham or David Wheeler, to the effect that:

Any problem in computer science can be solved with another level of indirection.

This is not a theorem in the sense of a mathematical theorem that can be proven; rather, it is a general principle for managing complexity through abstraction.

The theorem is often expanded by the humorous clause "...except for the problem of too many levels of indirection", referring to the fact that too many abstractions may create intrinsic complexity issues of their own. For example, the use of protocol layering in computer networks, which today is ubiquitous, has been criticized in ways that are typical of more general disadvantages of abstraction. Here, the adding of extra levels of indirection may cause higher layers to duplicate the functionality of lower layers, leading to inefficiency; and functionality at one layer may need data present only at another layer, which fundamentally violates the goal of separation into different layers.

== Origins ==
Wulf (1981) attributes the observation that all problems in computer science can be solved by "one more layer of indirection" to Roger Needham. This witticism was repeated by other authors, such as Black (1985). Butler Lampson, in his Turing Award lecture for 1992, repeats the observation but credits it to Needham's Cambridge colleague David Wheeler instead. None of these sources yet refers to the observation by any particular name.

Abrahams (2005), while tracing the observation itself back only as far as Lampson, credits Andrew Koenig with the invention of the name "Fundamental Theorem of Software Engineering".
