= Braithwell =

Village and civil parish in South Yorkshire, England

Coordinates: 53.4460°N 1.20179°W

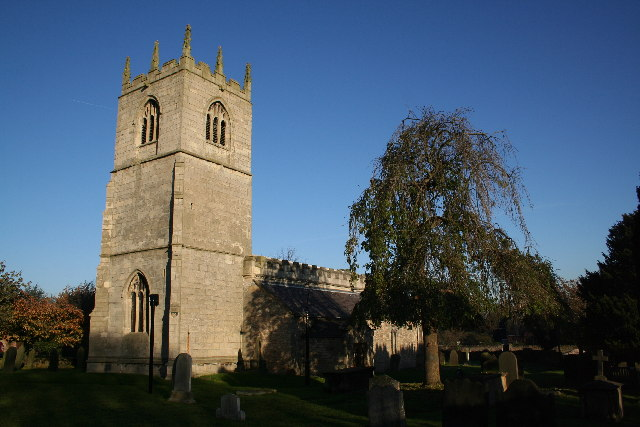
- Church of St James, Braithwell

- Location within South Yorkshire
- Population: 1,060 (2011 census)
- OS grid reference: SK531946
  - London: 140 mi (230 km) S
- Civil parish: Braithwell
- Metropolitan borough: Doncaster
- Metropolitan county: South Yorkshire
- Region: Yorkshire and the Humber
- Country: England
- Sovereign state: United Kingdom
- Post town: ROTHERHAM
- Postcode district: S66
- Police: South Yorkshire
- Fire: South Yorkshire
- Ambulance: Yorkshire

Braithwell is a village and civil parish in the Metropolitan Borough of Doncaster in South Yorkshire, England. It is about 1 mile (1.6 km) north from Maltby and 3 miles (5 km) south-east from Conisbrough. According to the 2001 Census the civil parish had a population of 1,056, increasing slightly to 1,060 at the 2011 Census.

The name Braithwell derives from the Old English brādwella meaning 'broad well'. Brād was later replaced by the Old Norse breiðr.

In 1289, the village obtained a Royal Charter entitling it to hold a weekly Tuesday market and an annual eight-day fair – an unusually long duration. These were long discontinued by a survey of 1652, but a cross shaft survives with an inscription in Norman French which translates as "Jesus, son of Mary, think upon the brother of our king, I beseech you".

The Church of St James in the village is a Grade II* listed building.

== See also ==
- Listed buildings in Braithwell
