= David Wheeler (computer scientist) =

British computer scientist (1927–2004)

David Wheeler FRS
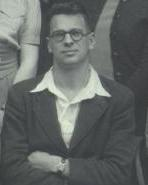
- Born: David John Wheeler; 9 February 1927; Birmingham, England
- Died: 13 December 2004 (aged 77); Cambridge, England
- Education: University of Cambridge (MA, PhD)
- Known for: inventing subroutines Burrows–Wheeler transform (BWT); Tiny Encryption Algorithm (TEA); Wheeler Jump; WAKE; EDSAC
- Awards: Fellow of the Royal Society (1981); Computer Pioneer Award (1985); Fellow, Computer History Museum (2003)
- Scientific career
- Fields: Computer Science
- Workplaces: University of Cambridge; Computer Lab, Cambridge; Darwin College, Cambridge
- Thesis: Automatic Computing With EDSAC (1951)
- Doctoral advisor: Maurice Wilkes
- Doctoral students: Michael Burrows; Li Gong; Andy Hopper; Mathai Joseph; Roger Needham; Bjarne Stroustrup

David John Wheeler FRS (9 February 1927 – 13 December 2004) was an English computer scientist and professor of computer science at the University of Cambridge.

== Education ==
Wheeler was born in Birmingham, England, the second of the three children of (Agnes) Marjorie, née Gudgeon, and Arthur Wheeler, a press tool maker, engineer, and proprietor of a small shopfitting firm. He was educated at a local primary school in Birmingham and then went on to King Edward VI Camp Hill School after winning a scholarship in 1938. His education was disrupted by World War II, and he completed his sixth form studies at Hanley High School. In 1945 he gained a scholarship to study the Cambridge Mathematical Tripos at Trinity College, Cambridge, graduating in 1948. He was awarded the world's first PhD in computer science in 1951.

== Career ==
Wheeler's contributions to the field included work on the Electronic Delay Storage Automatic Calculator (EDSAC) in the 1950s and the Burrows–Wheeler transform (published 1994). Along with Maurice Wilkes and Stanley Gill, he is credited with the invention around 1951 of the subroutine (which they referred to as the closed subroutine), and gave the first explanation of how to design software libraries; as a result, the jump to subroutine instruction was often called a Wheeler Jump. Wilkes published a paper in 1953 discussing relative addressing to facilitate the use of subroutines. (However, Turing had discussed subroutines in a paper of 1945 on design proposals for the NPL ACE, going so far as to invent the concept of a return address stack.)

He was responsible for the implementation of the CAP computer, the first to be based on security capabilities. In cryptography, he was the designer of WAKE and the co-designer of the TEA and XTEA encryption algorithms together with Roger Needham. In 1950, with Maurice Wilkes, he used EDSAC to solve a differential equation relating to gene frequencies in a paper by Ronald Fisher. This represents the first use of a computer for a problem in the field of biology.

He became a Fellow of Darwin College, Cambridge in 1964 and formally retired in 1994, although he continued to be an active member of the University of Cambridge Computer Laboratory until his death.

== Personal life ==
On 24 August 1957, Wheeler married astrophysics research student Joyce Margaret Blackler, who had used EDSAC for her own mathematical investigations as a research student from 1955. Together they had two daughters and a son.

Wheeler died of a heart attack on 13 December 2004 while cycling home from the Computer Laboratory.

== Recognition and legacy ==
Wheeler:

- In 1981 was elected a fellow of the Royal Society
- In 1985 received a Computer Pioneer Award for his contributions to assembly language programming
- In 1994 was inducted as a Fellow of the Association for Computing Machinery
- In 2003 was named a Computer History Museum Fellow Award recipient "for his invention of the closed subroutine, and for his architectural contributions to ILLIAC, the Cambridge Ring, and computer testing"

The Computer Laboratory at the University of Cambridge annually holds the "Wheeler Lecture", a series of distinguished lectures named after him.

== Quotes ==
Wheeler is often quoted as saying "All problems in computer science can be solved by another level of indirection." or "All problems in computer science can be solved by another level of indirection, except for the problem of too many layers of indirection." This has been called the fundamental theorem of software engineering.

Another quotation attributed to him is "Compatibility means deliberately repeating other people's mistakes."
