= Roger Needham =

British computer scientist

Roger Needham CBE FRS FREng
- Needham in 1999
- Born: 9 February 1935; Sheffield, England, UK
- Died: 1 March 2003 (aged 68); Willingham, Cambridgeshire, England, UK
- Education: Doncaster Grammar School for Boys
- Alma mater: University of Cambridge (BA, PhD)
- Known for: Needham–Schroeder protocol BAN logic Tiny Encryption Algorithm; XTEA
- Spouse: Karen Spärck Jones (m. 1958)
- Awards: Faraday Medal (1998)
- Scientific career
- Fields: Computer science
- Workplaces: University of Cambridge; Microsoft
- Thesis: The application of digital computers to problems of classification and grouping (1962)
- Doctoral advisor: David Wheeler
- Doctoral students: Ross J. Anderson; Andrew Herbert; David M. Jackson; David L. Tennenhouse
- Website: www.cl.cam.ac.uk/archive/ksj21/RogerNeedham.html

Roger Michael Needham (9 February 1935 – 1 March 2003) was a British computer scientist.

== Early life and education ==
Needham was born in Birmingham, England, the only child of Phyllis Mary, née Baker (c.1904–1976) and Leonard William Needham (c.1905–1973), a university chemistry lecturer. He attended Doncaster Grammar School for Boys in Doncaster (then in the West Riding) going on to St John's College, Cambridge in 1953, and graduating with a BA in 1956 in mathematics and philosophy. His PhD thesis was on applications of digital computers to the automatic classification and retrieval of documents. He worked on a variety of key computing projects in security, operating systems, computer architecture (capability systems) and local area networks.

== Career and research ==
Among Needham's theoretical contributions is the development of the Burrows–Abadi–Needham logic for authentication, generally known as the BAN logic. His Needham–Schroeder (co-invented with Michael Schroeder) security protocol forms the basis of the Kerberos authentication and key exchange system. He also co-designed the TEA and XTEA encryption algorithms. He pioneered the technique of protecting passwords using a one-way hash function.

In 1962, he joined the University of Cambridge's Computer Laboratory, then called the Mathematical Laboratory, serving as the Head of the Laboratory from 1980 until 1995. He was made a professor in 1981 and remained with the laboratory until his retirement in 1998. Between 1996 and 1998, Needham served as the pro-vice chancellor at the University of Cambridge. In 1997, he set up Microsoft's UK-based Research Laboratory. He was a founding Fellow of University College, Cambridge, which became Wolfson College.

Needham was a longtime and respected member of the International Association for Cryptologic Research, the IEEE Computer Society Technical Committee on Security and Privacy, and the University Grants Committee. He was made a fellow of the Association for Computing Machinery in 1994.

=== Awards and honours ===
Needham was elected a Fellow of the Royal Society (FRS) in 1985 and a Fellow of the Royal Academy of Engineering (FREng) in 1993. He was appointed Commander of the Order of the British Empire (CBE) for his contributions to computing in 2001. Needham held honorary doctorate degrees from the University of Twente, Loughborough University, and the University of Kent.

=== Named in Needham's honour ===
Needham has several awards named after him in his honour. The British Computer Society established an annual Roger Needham Award in 2004.

The European Conference on Computer Systems (EuroSys) established the annual Roger Needham PhD Award. It awards €2,000 to a PhD student from a European university whose thesis is regarded to be an exceptional, innovative contribution to knowledge in the computer systems area. Past winners have been:

- 2021 Victor van de Veen (Vrije Universiteit Amsterdam)
- 2020 Michael Schwarz (Graz University of Technology) for his PhD thesis Software-based Side-Channel Attacks and Defenses in Restricted Environments
- 2019 Manolis Karpathiotakis, EPFL
- 2018 Dennis Andriesse (Vrije Universiteit Amsterdam) for his PhD thesis Analyzing and Securing Binaries Through Static Disassembly
- 2015 Cristiano Giuffrida (Vrije Universiteit Amsterdam) for his PhD thesis Safe and Automatic Live Update
- 2014 Torvald Riegel (Technische Universitaet Dresden), for his thesis Software Transactional Memory Building Blocks
- 2013 Asia Slowinska (Vrije Universiteit Amsterdam) for her PhD thesis Using Information Flow Tracking to Protect Legacy Binaries
- 2012 Derek Murray, for his thesis A Distributed Execution Engine Supporting Data-Dependent Control Flow
- 2011 Jorrit Herder for Building a Dependable Operating System: Fault Tolerance in MINIX 3
- 2010 Willem de Bruijn (Vrije Universiteit Amsterdam) for Adaptive Operating System Design for High Throughput I/O
- 2009 Jacob Gorm Hansen (DIKU) for Virtual Machine Mobility with Self-Migration
- 2008 Adam Dunkels (SICS) for Programming Memory-Constrained Networked Embedded Systems
- 2007 Nick Cook (Newcastle University) for Middleware Support for Non-repudiable Business-to-Business Interactions
- 2006 Oliver Heckmann (TU Darmstadt) for A System-oriented Approach to Efficiency and Quality of Service for Internet Service Providers

== Personal life ==
Needham married fellow computer scientist Karen Spärck Jones in 1958. He died of cancer in March 2003 at his home in Willingham, Cambridgeshire.
