= Doncaster Central =

UK Parliament constituency (since 1983)

Coordinates: 53.49°N 1.13°W

- County constituency for the House of Commons
- Interactive map of boundaries from 2024
- Boundary of Doncaster Central in Yorkshire and the Humber
- County: South Yorkshire
- Electorate: 70,446 (December 2019)
- Major settlements: Doncaster, Armthorpe, Tickhill and Edenthorpe

Current constituency
- Created: 1983
- Member of Parliament: Sally Jameson (Labour)
- Seats: One
- Created from: Doncaster; Don Valley

Doncaster Central is a constituency (Note: A county constituency (for the purposes of election expenses and type of returning officer)) represented in the House of Commons of the UK Parliament since 2024 by Sally Jameson of the Labour Party. (Note: As with all constituencies, the constituency elects one Member of Parliament (MP) by the first past the post system of election at least every five years.)

== Constituency profile ==
The Doncaster Central constituency is located in South Yorkshire within the City of Doncaster borough. It covers most of the city of Doncaster—including the city centre and the neighbourhoods of Balby, Intake, Armthorpe, Edenthorpe and part of Bessacarr—and a rural area to the south of the city stretching to the small market town of Tickhill. Doncaster was traditionally an important railway town and coal mining area. High levels of deprivation are present in most of the city, whilst Bessacarr and Tickhill are wealthier. Average house prices are lower than the rest of Yorkshire and considerably lower than the national average.

In general, residents of Doncaster Central have low household incomes and low levels of education and professional employment compared to nationwide averages. At the 2021 census, White people made up 88% of the population. At the city council, wards in this constituency are mostly represented by Reform UK and the Labour Party, with some Conservative councillors elected in Bessacarr and the rural area around Tickhill. Voters in the constituency strongly supported leaving the European Union in the 2016 referendum, with an estimated 67% voting for Brexit.

== History ==
Created in 1983, the seat covers most of the Yorkshire city of Doncaster. It is considered a Labour stronghold, although the 2019 result was more marginal, with Labour defeating the Conservatives by a majority of 5.5%. Dame Rosie Winterton represented the seat from 1997 to 2024, serving as a Deputy Speaker in the House of Commons from 2017 to 2024.

== Boundaries ==
The constituency includes most of the city of Doncaster and neighbours the Doncaster North, Doncaster East and the Isle of Axholme, Rawmarsh and Conisbrough, Rother Valley, and Bassetlaw seats.

1983–2010: The Metropolitan Borough of Doncaster wards of Armthorpe, Balby, Bessacarr, Central, Intake, Town Field, and Wheatley.

2010–2024: The Metropolitan Borough of Doncaster wards of Armthorpe, Balby, Bessacarr and Cantley, Central, Edenthorpe, Kirk Sandall and Barnby Dun, Town Moor, and Wheatley.

2024–present: The City of Doncaster wards of Armthorpe, Balby South, Bessacarr, Edenthorpe & Kirk Sandall, Hexthorpe & Balby North, Tickhill & Wadworth, Town, and Wheatley Hills & Intake.

Minor changes to reflect revised ward boundaries, including the gain from Don Valley of Tickhill and Wadworth in the south, and the transfer to Doncaster North of Barnby Dun in the north.

== Members of Parliament ==
Doncaster and Don Valley prior to 1983

| Election | Member | Party |
|---|---|---|
| 1983 | Sir Harold Walker | Labour |
| 1997 | Dame Rosie Winterton | Labour |
| 2024 | Sally Jameson | Labour Co-op |

== Elections ==
General election results since 1983

=== Elections in the 2020s ===
General election 2024: Doncaster Central
| Party | Candidate | Votes | % | ±% |
|---|---|---|---|---|
| Labour Co-op | Sally Jameson | 17,515 | 46.2 | +6.8 |
| Conservative | Nick Allen | 7,964 | 21.0 | −15.6 |
| Reform UK | Surjit Duhre | 7,886 | 20.8 | +5.2 |
| Green | Jennifer Rozenfelds | 1,880 | 5.0 | +2.7 |
| Liberal Democrats | Greg Ruback | 1,199 | 3.2 | −0.9 |
| Workers Party | Tosh McDonald | 758 | 2.0 | N/A |
| Yorkshire | Andrew Walmsley | 742 | 2.0 | −0.1 |
| Majority | | 9,551 | 25.2 | +22.4 |
| Turnout | | 37,944 | 50.7 | −10.6 |
| Registered electors | | 74,678 | | |
| Labour hold | | Swing | +11.2 | |

=== Elections in the 2010s ===
2019 notional result
| Party | Vote | % |
|---|---|---|
| Labour | 18,124 | 39.4 |
| Conservative | 16,853 | 36.6 |
| Brexit Party | 7,173 | 15.6 |
| Liberal Democrats | 1,038 | 4.1 |
| Green | 1,038 | 2.3 |
| Others | 971 | 2.1 |
| Turnout | 46,043 | 61.4 |
| Electorate | 75,007 | |

General election 2019: Doncaster Central
| Party | Candidate | Votes | % | ±% |
|---|---|---|---|---|
| Labour | Rosie Winterton | 16,638 | 40.0 | −17.9 |
| Conservative | Roberto Weeden-Sanz | 14,360 | 34.5 | +0.1 |
| Brexit Party | Surjit Duhre | 6,842 | 16.5 | New |
| Liberal Democrats | Paul Horton | 1,748 | 4.2 | +1.9 |
| Yorkshire | Leon French | 1,012 | 2.4 | −0.7 |
| Green | Frank Sheridan | 981 | 2.4 | New |
| Majority | | 2,278 | 5.5 | −18.0 |
| Turnout | | 41,581 | 58.2 | −1.8 |
| Labour hold | | Swing | -9.0 | |

General election 2017: Doncaster Central
| Party | Candidate | Votes | % | ±% |
|---|---|---|---|---|
| Labour | Rosie Winterton | 24,915 | 57.9 | +8.8 |
| Conservative | Tom Hunt | 14,784 | 34.4 | +13.7 |
| Yorkshire | Chris Whitwood | 1,346 | 3.1 | New |
| Independent | Eddie Todd | 1,006 | 2.3 | New |
| Liberal Democrats | Alison Brelsford | 973 | 2.3 | −1.9 |
| Majority | | 10,131 | 23.5 | −1.5 |
| Turnout | | 43,024 | 60.0 | +3.2 |
| Labour hold | | Swing | -2.4 | |

General election 2015: Doncaster Central
| Party | Candidate | Votes | % | ±% |
|---|---|---|---|---|
| Labour | Rosie Winterton | 19,840 | 49.1 | +9.4 |
| UKIP | Chris Hodgson | 9,747 | 24.1 | +20.7 |
| Conservative | Zoë Metcalfe | 8,386 | 20.7 | −4.1 |
| Liberal Democrats | John Brown | 1,717 | 4.2 | −16.9 |
| TUSC | Mev Akram | 421 | 1.0 | New |
| English Democrat | David Burnett | 309 | 0.8 | −3.6 |
| Majority | | 10,093 | 25.0 | +10.1 |
| Turnout | | 40,420 | 56.8 | +1.3 |
| Labour hold | | Swing | | |

General election 2010: Doncaster Central
| Party | Candidate | Votes | % | ±% |
|---|---|---|---|---|
| Labour | Rosie Winterton | 16,569 | 39.7 | −11.3 |
| Conservative | Gareth M. Davies | 10,340 | 24.8 | +6.1 |
| Liberal Democrats | Patrick Wilson | 8,795 | 21.1 | −2.6 |
| English Democrat | Lawrence E. Parramore | 1,816 | 4.4 | New |
| BNP | John Bettney | 1,762 | 4.2 | +0.9 |
| UKIP | John Andrews | 1,421 | 3.4 | 0.0 |
| Independent | Scott A. Pickles | 970 | 2.3 | New |
| Citizens for Undead Rights and Equality | Derek A. Williams | 72 | 0.2 | New |
| Majority | | 6,229 | 14.9 | −13.6 |
| Turnout | | 41,745 | 55.5 | +3.5 |
| Labour hold | | Swing | −8.7 | |

=== Elections in the 2000s ===
General election 2005: Doncaster Central
| Party | Candidate | Votes | % | ±% |
|---|---|---|---|---|
| Labour | Rosie Winterton | 17,617 | 51.3 | −7.8 |
| Liberal Democrats | Patrick Wilson | 7,815 | 22.8 | +9.9 |
| Conservative | Stefan Kerner | 6,489 | 18.9 | −4.8 |
| BNP | John Wilkinson | 1,239 | 3.6 | New |
| UKIP | Alan Simmons | 1,191 | 3.5 | +0.8 |
| Majority | | 9,802 | 28.5 | −6.9 |
| Turnout | | 34,351 | 52.3 | +0.7 |
| Labour hold | | Swing | −8.8 | |

General election 2001: Doncaster Central
| Party | Candidate | Votes | % | ±% |
|---|---|---|---|---|
| Labour | Rosie Winterton | 20,034 | 59.1 | −3.0 |
| Conservative | Gary Meggitt | 8,035 | 23.7 | +2.7 |
| Liberal Democrats | Michael Southcombe | 4,390 | 12.9 | +3.5 |
| UKIP | David Gordon | 926 | 2.7 | +1.6 |
| Socialist Alliance | Janet Terry | 517 | 1.5 | New |
| Majority | | 11,999 | 35.4 | −5.7 |
| Turnout | | 33,902 | 51.6 | −12.3 |
| Labour hold | | Swing | | |

=== Elections in the 1990s ===
General election 1997: Doncaster Central
| Party | Candidate | Votes | % | ±% |
|---|---|---|---|---|
| Labour | Rosie Winterton | 26,961 | 62.1 | +7.8 |
| Conservative | David Turtle | 9,105 | 21.0 | −12.5 |
| Liberal Democrats | Simon Tarry | 4,091 | 9.4 | −2.4 |
| Referendum | Michael Cliff | 1,273 | 2.9 | New |
| Socialist Labour | Michael Kenny | 854 | 2.0 | New |
| ProLife Alliance | Jonathan Redden | 694 | 1.6 | New |
| UKIP | Peter Davies | 462 | 1.1 | New |
| Majority | | 17,856 | 41.1 | +20.3 |
| Turnout | | 43,440 | 63.9 | −10.3 |
| Labour hold | | Swing | | |

General election 1992: Doncaster Central
| Party | Candidate | Votes | % | ±% |
|---|---|---|---|---|
| Labour | Harold Walker | 27,795 | 54.3 | +3.1 |
| Conservative | George Glossop | 17,113 | 33.5 | −1.7 |
| Liberal Democrats | Clifford Hampson | 6,057 | 11.8 | −1.8 |
| Workers Revolutionary | Michael Driver | 184 | 0.4 | New |
| Majority | | 10,682 | 20.8 | +4.8 |
| Turnout | | 51,149 | 74.2 | +0.5 |
| Labour hold | | Swing | +2.5 | |

=== Elections in the 1980s ===
General election 1987: Doncaster Central
| Party | Candidate | Votes | % | ±% |
|---|---|---|---|---|
| Labour | Harold Walker | 26,266 | 51.2 | +9.2 |
| Conservative | Patricia Rawlings | 18,070 | 35.2 | −1.9 |
| SDP | James Gore-Browne | 7,004 | 13.6 | −7.3 |
| Majority | | 8,196 | 16.0 | +11.1 |
| Turnout | | 51,340 | 73.7 | +2.9 |
| Labour hold | | Swing | +5.6 | |

General election 1983: Doncaster Central
| Party | Candidate | Votes | % | ±% |
|---|---|---|---|---|
| Labour | Harold Walker | 21,154 | 42.0 | |
| Conservative | John Somers | 18,646 | 37.1 | |
| SDP | Trevor Stables | 10,524 | 20.9 | |
| Majority | | 2,508 | 4.9 | |
| Turnout | | 50,324 | 70.8 | |
| Labour win (new seat) | | | | |

== See also ==
- List of parliamentary constituencies in South Yorkshire
- List of parliamentary constituencies in the Yorkshire and the Humber (region)

== Sources ==
- Guardian Unlimited Politics (Election results from 1992 to the present)
- Politicsresources.net - Official Web Site ✔ (Election results from 1951 to the present)
