= David Hartley (computer scientist) =

British computer scientist

Dr David Hartley
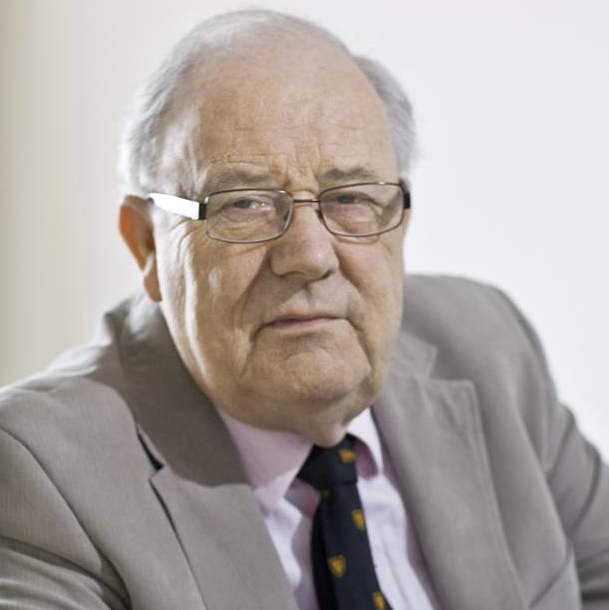
- Born: 14 September 1937 (age 88); Halifax, Yorkshire, England
- Education: Clare College, Cambridge
- Known for: EDSAC 2 Autocode; CPL; Titan Multiple Access System; Director of University of Cambridge Computing Service (23 years); UK Government Committees (inc. advisor to Prime Minister); Granta Backbone Network; Establishment of the United Kingdom Education and Research Networking Association (UKERNA); President, British Computer Society (1999); Chairman, Computer Conservation Society (2007); EDSAC Replica Project
- Scientific career
- Fields: Computer science
- Workplaces: University of Cambridge; Computing Service; Computer Laboratory; United Kingdom Educational and Research Association (now JANET); Cambridge Crystallographic Data Centre (CCDC); Clare College, Cambridge; The National Museum of Computing (TNMoC); British Computer Society; Computer Conservation Society
- Thesis: Automatic Programming for Digital Computers (1963)
- Doctoral advisor: Maurice Wilkes

David Fielding Hartley FBCS (born 14 September 1937) is a computer scientist and Fellow of Clare College, Cambridge. He was Director of the University of Cambridge Computing Service from 1970–1994, Chief Executive of United Kingdom Joint Academic Network (JANET) 1994–1997, and Executive Director of Cambridge Crystallographic Data Centre (CCDC) 1997–2002. He is now much involved with the National Museum of Computing.

He was involved in the development of the programming language CPL, whose influence can be traced on to C, and C++. He was president of the British Computer Society from 1999 to 2000 and chairman of the Computer Conservation Society from 2007 to 2011.

== Student years ==
Dr Hartley became an undergraduate at Clare College, University of Cambridge in 1956. He read Mathematics for the first two years and studied Numerical Analysis and Automatic Computing in his third year, graduating BA in 1959. He then became a research student of computer science, developing the first programming language "Autocode", and its compiler for the EDSAC 2 computer, for which he was awarded a PhD degree in 1963. His thesis was entitled "Automatic Programming for Digital Computers".

== Software development ==
As a member of the staff of Cambridge University's Mathematical Laboratory, he was joint author, with David Barron, John Buxton, Eric Nixon, and Christopher Strachey, of the early high-level programming language CPL. which was subsequently developed into BCPL which in turn influenced B and C.

From 1962 to 1967 he was a major contributor to the development of the Cambridge Multiple Access System that was developed for the Titan, the prototype Atlas 2 computer built by Ferranti for the university. This was the first time-sharing system developed outside the United States, and it influenced the later development of UNIX.

Hartley was successively Junior Research Fellow at Churchill College, Cambridge, Fellow of Darwin College and then University Lecturer. He also did some pioneering work in video-tape recorded lecturers. In 1986, he was elected a Fellow of Clare College where he is currently secretary of the Alumni Association.

== Computing service ==
Between 1970 and 1994, Dr Hartley was director of University of Cambridge Computing Service.

The service had been founded as the Mathematical Laboratory under the leadership of John Lennard-Jones in 1937, although it did not become properly established until after World War II when Maurice Wilkes became Director. Upon its foundation, it was intended "to provide a computing service for general use, and to be a centre for the development of computational techniques in the University" and Wilkes continued this strong service ethos. He learnt about electronic computation, reading John von Neumann's First Draft of a Report on the EDVAC and attending the final two weeks of the Moore School Lectures. EDSAC was the result, and Wilkes also supervised Hartley's PhD.

When Dr Hartley became Director, the Mathematical Laboratory was renamed the Computer Laboratory, with separate departments for Teaching and Research, and the Computing Service. One of Dr Hartley' most notable achievements as Director between 1987 and 1992, was to conceive and design the Granta Backbone Network, a fibre-optic network that joined up all of Cambridge's university and college sites.

== Public service ==
From 1972 to 1974 Dr Hartley was chairman of the UK Inter-University Committee on Computing. He was a member of the Computer Board for Universities and Research Councils – which allocated government funds to purchase the large and expensive computers that the institutions needed – from 1979 to 1983 where he had special responsibility for network development. From 1981 to 1986 he was a member of the Prime Minister's Information Technology Advisory Panel. Having become a Fellow of the British Computer Society (FBCS) in 1968, Dr Hartley served on its Council in 1970–73, 1977–1980 and 1988 to 1990, was a Vice-President from 1987 to 1990, Deputy President in 1998–99 and President in 1999–2000.

Since ceasing to be Director of the University Computing Service, Dr Hartley has served both private sector and public sector bodies, but the latter have predominated.

From 1994 to 1997 he was Chief Executive of the United Kingdom Education and Research Networking Association (UKERNA) whose objectives were to take responsibility for the UK academic community's networking programme, and to further opportunities with other communities, including industry. It developed JANET, the UK's joint academic network, which provides computer network and related collaborative services to UK education and research, including further- and higher-education organisations and the UK Research Councils.

From 1997 to 2002, Dr Hartley was Executive Director of the Cambridge Crystallographic Data Centre which maintains the largest searchable database of experimentally-determined small molecule crystal structures. It performs analyses on these data and facilitates others' use.

Dr Hartley maintains strong ties with the University of Cambridge where he continues to be a Fellow of Clare College and an Honorary Member of the Computer Laboratory. He has recently become involved in the history of computing, serving for four years as Chairman of the Computer Conservation Society, a special-interest group of the British Computer Society. In 2012 he spent a year as part-time Museum Director of The National Museum of Computing and is currently a trustee of the EDSAC Replica Project.

== Sources ==
- Cambridge University Computing Laboratory: DR DAVID HARTLEY – CAREER SUMMARY, University of Cambridge
- Dr. David Hartley, The National Museum of Computing
