= Alastair Beresford =

British computer scientist

- Citizenship: British
- Education: University of Cambridge (BA)
- Scientific career
- Fields: Security; Software Engineering; Ubiquitous Computing
- Workplaces: University of Cambridge
- Thesis: Location privacy in ubiquitous computing (2004)
- Doctoral advisor: Andy Hopper
- Website: https://www.cst.cam.ac.uk/people/arb33

Alastair Richard Beresford is the current head of department and Professor of Computer Security at the Department of Computer Science and Technology at the University of Cambridge and the Robin Walker Fellow at Queens' College, Cambridge. He co-founded the Raspberry Pi Computing Education Research Centre with Sue Sentance in 2024.

== Education ==
Beresford obtained a Bachelor of Arts in Computer Science with First Class Honours from the University of Cambridge in 1999. He then obtained his PhD in Engineering from Cambridge in 2004. His thesis was titled "Location privacy in ubiquitous computing", supervised by Andy Hopper.

== Career ==
During his PhD, Beresford interned at AT&T Labs Research in Florham Park in New Jersey in the summer of 2001, working on dynamic routing algorithm design. He was subsequently a researcher at Fraser Research with Sandy Fraser in Princeton in 2004, evaluating digital rights management systems.

Beresford returned to Cambridge as a research associate in 2004, designing a prototype platform for road and rail network data. He then became an RCUK Academic Fellow in 2007, eventually becoming a full professor of computer security in 2019. He became the head of department at the Cambridge Computer Laboratory from October 2023, succeeding Ann Copestake.

== Research ==
Beresford researched location privacy and mix zones during his PhD, a construction inspired by anonymity techniques that assigns users new pseudonyms as they pass through spatial regions, preventing continuous tracking in location-aware services. He also developed the Pudding protocol for private user discovery in anonymity networks and Rollercoaster, an efficient group-multicast scheme for mix networks.

Beresford lead the Device Analyzer project from 2011, an Android app that collected usage data from over 30,000 devices worldwide, producing the largest publicly available dataset of Android phone usage at the time Beresford also co-developed CoverDrop, a secure whistleblower communication system. The Guardian deployed this as "Secure Messaging" in the Guardian mobile app in June 2025, using cover traffic from millions of readers to hide genuine whistleblower messages.

In 2019, Beresford co-discovered that per-device factory calibration data in accelerometers and gyroscopes can be inferred from sensor output to create globally unique device fingerprints, which led to fixes in both iOS and Android. He subsequently identified a logic error in OpenSSH where both fake and real keystroke packets were sent unconditionally, allowing passive observers to obtain timing information about passwords.

With Martin Kleppmann, he developed a conflict-free replicated data type for JSON, enabling collaborative applications without trusting service providers..

Beresford has also founded several research centres. He is the co-director (with Cecilia Mascolo) of the Centre for Mobile, Wearable Systems and Augmented Intelligence at Cambridge. Previously in 2015 he also co-founded the Cambridge Cybercrime Centre, a multi-disciplinary initiative combining computer science, criminology, and law.

== Teaching and computing education ==
Since 2013, Beresford has been the technical director of the Isaac Learning Platform founded by Lisa_Jardine-Wright (IsaacPhysics, IsaacScience and Ada Computer Science). This has supported over 500,000 users and served 200 million question attempts as of 2025.

He also co-founded the Raspberry Pi Computing Education Research Centre with the Raspberry Pi Foundation, investigating how to engage all young people in computing.

Beresford was the Director of Studies in Computer Science at Robinson College, Cambridge from 2004-2017 and subsequently became the Robin Walker Fellow in Computer Science at Queens' College, Cambridge from 2017.

== Awards ==
Beresford was awarded the Cambridge Pilkington Prize for excellence in teaching in 2014.
