= Margaret Marrs =

English computer programmer (born 1929)

- Born: 1929; Lancashire, England
- Died: 3 February 2022 (aged 92–93)
- Education: Girton College, Cambridge
- Known for: Senior Operator of the original Electronic delay storage automatic computer (EDSAC), an early British computer constructed at the University of Cambridge Mathematical Laboratory
- Scientific career
- Workplaces: Ferranti; University of Cambridge Mathematical Laboratory

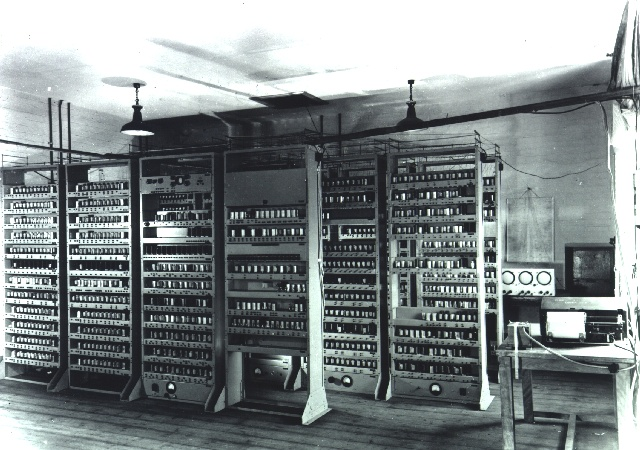
EDSAC

Margaret Marrs (née Lewin; 1929 – 3 February 2022) was an English computer programmer who was the Senior Operator of the original Electronic delay storage automatic computer (EDSAC). EDSAC was an early British computer constructed at the University of Cambridge Mathematical Laboratory in England, and the second electronic digital stored-program computer to go into regular service.

== Education ==
Born in Lancashire, Marrs grew up in a village called Simonstone. She attended the Clitheroe Royal Grammar School where she completed maths, Latin, and French as her Higher School Certificate subjects. She studied maths at Girton College, Cambridge, graduating in 1951.

== Career ==
In 1951, Marrs worked as a computer programmer for Ferranti, a UK electrical engineering and equipment firm based in Manchester. Her work focused on adapting 39 differential equations for automatic computers. She accomplished this by working from a paper published in the late 1940s by Stanley Gill, adapting the Runge–Kutta method of solving differential equations for automatic computers.

In 1952, Marrs returned to Cambridge where she was employed by University of Cambridge Mathematical Laboratory as the Senior Operator for EDSAC. Her job included punching tape into the computer to run programs.

In 2016, Marrs and other former EDSAC computer scientists, including Joyce Wheeler and Liz Howe, assisted the National Museum of Computing's efforts to recreate the EDSAC by providing information on the EDSAC's machinery. Marrs and other EDSAC veterans visited the reconstruction team to celebrate the 70th anniversary of EDSAC.

== Legacy ==
Marrs left generous legacies to the Fitzwilliam Museum and Girton College.
