= Alexander G. Fraser =

British-American computer scientist (1937–2022)

Alexander G. Fraser FBCS
- Born: 8 June 1937; Surrey, England
- Died: 13 June 2022
- Citizenship: British-American
- Education: University of Bristol; University of Cambridge
- Years active: 1960-2014
- Awards: 1989 Koji Kobayashi Computers and Communications Award; 1992 SIGCOMM Award; 2001 IEEE Richard W. Hamming Medal
- Scientific career
- Fields: computer networking

Alexander G. Fraser (8 June 1937 – 13 June 2022), also known as A. G. Fraser and Sandy Fraser, was a noted British-American computer scientist and the former Chief Scientist of AT&T.

== Early life and education ==
Fraser was born in Surrey, England and spent the war years with his family in Lancashire and subsequently in Weston Super Mare. Fraser received his B.Sc. degree in aeronautical engineering from Bristol University in 1958, the diploma in computer science from the University of Cambridge in 1959, and a Ph.D. from the same institution in 1969.

== Career ==
=== Early career ===
After graduating with the Diploma in Computer Science from Cambridge, Fraser began his career at Ferranti in 1960, where he wrote subroutines for the Sirius computer developed there. He subsequently developed the higher-level NEBULA programming language for the Orion operating system.

=== Return to Cambridge ===
In 1966 he returned to Cambridge as a Senior Technical Officer and later (from 1968) as faculty-level Assistant Director of Research in the Computer Laboratory. He worked with Roger Needham to design and implement the Titan computer's file system. Fraser engineered support for file archival and robustness with support for multi-user access control and later formalised the notion of persistent names. In 1968 he represented Cambridge at the first NATO Software Engineering conference in Garmisch, Germany.

=== Moving to AT&T ===
He moved to AT&T Bell Laboratories in 1969 where he invented cell-based networks and co-developed a reduced instruction set computer prototype with techniques for instruction set optimization. He subsequently became director of its Computing Science Research Center (1982), Executive Director (1987), and Associate Vice President for Information Science Research (1994). As Vice President for Research, he founded AT&T Laboratories in 1996, and in 1998 was named AT&T Chief Scientist.

At Bell Labs in the 1970s, Fraser became deeply involved with the development of the Unix operating system. For v6, he built the Spider local-area ring that anticipated ATM networks. Spider was a packet switched data communications system that provided full-duplex asynchronous channels to connected terminals with automatic error control, and a loop transmission topology via a central switching computer. Services on Spider that were precursors to modern equivalents included a network file store, block storage, a virtualization layer which forwarded UNIX system calls in a dumb terminal to a remote machine, and network boot support. He also originated the Unix Circuit Design System (UCDS) with Steve Bourne, Joe Condon and Andrew Hume. UCDS was an early hardware description language that created descriptions using interactive graphics, laid out boards automatically with circuit consistency checks, and optimized combinatorial circuits for FPGAs.

Fraser established the necessity for a standard interface between computers and data communications systems in 1972 and subsequently developed Datakit for Unix v7, described by Douglas McIlroy as a "central office" for data communication that improved the UNIX support for distributed computing. In the late 1980s, Fraser lead the Experimental Universities Network (XUNET) project to promote graduate research on computer networks. Eight universities and labs across the country were linked by a network of Datakit virtual circuit switches joined by high-speed links to provide a wide area systems research laboratory where student researchers could run network experiments. His 1983 paper was among the first to propose ubiquitous networking connectivity:

Ubiquity in telecommunications suggests a standard wall socket distributed about as widely as electric power outlets are now. An appliance plugged into one of these sockets will be able to reach, by some simple and standard procedure, another appliance plugged into any other socket.

— A.G. Fraser, Towards a Universal Data Transport System

Subsequently in the 1990s, Fraser worked on bringing high-speed networking to every home in the USA and supported the development of applications to utilise this capacity. He worked with Nikil Jayant to create high quality audio compression standards based upon perceptual audio coding which eventually resulted in the MPEG AAC international standard. Bjarne Stroustrup started work on the C++ language during this time to support these networked applications.

=== Retirement and Fraser Research ===
After his retirement in 2002 he established Fraser Research in Princeton, New Jersey. He resumed his initiative towards designing a next-generation Internet architecture as part of the 100x100 future internet project. The next-generation network Fraser designed was structured around a high capacity global Ethernet and a network operating system which controlled activities across that network.

== Awards and recognition ==
Fraser was a member of the National Academy of Engineering, and a Fellow of the British Computer Society and IEEE for contributions and leadership in the design of switched virtual circuit networks. He has received the 1989 Koji Kobayashi Computers and Communications Award "for contributions to computer communications and the invention of virtual-circuit switching", the 1992 SIGCOMM Award for "pioneering concepts, such as virtual circuit switching, space-division packet switching, and window flow control", and the 2001 IEEE Richard W. Hamming Medal "for pioneering contributions to the architecture of communication networks through the development of virtual circuit switching technology".

The Cambridge Computer Laboratory held a posthumous memorial in February 2023 to recount Fraser's achievements, and also published his last monograph which collates Fraser's research on his clean-slate design for a next-generation Internet. The National Academy of Engineering featured Fraser in the 27th volume of its Memorial Tributes series in August 2024.
