= Ian Lewis =

Ian Lewis may refer to:

- Ian Lewis (computer scientist) (born 1961), British computer scientist
- Ian Lewis (cricketer) (1935–2004), Irish cricketer
- Ian Lewis, a member of Jamaican reggae band Inner Circle
