= Andrew Herbert =

British computer scientist

Andrew James Herbert, OBE, FREng (born 1954) is a British computer scientist, formerly Chairman of Microsoft Research, for the Europe, Middle East and Africa region.

== Biography ==
Herbert received a bachelor's of science degree in computational science from the Leeds University in 1975, and a PhD degree in computer science from Cambridge University in 1978 for his work on "A Microprogrammed Operating System Kernel".

In 1978 he started working at the University of Cambridge Computer Laboratory as assistant lecturer under Maurice Wilkes and Roger Needham in the Computer Laboratory, and worked with others on the "Cambridge Model Distributed System". In 1985 he left Cambridge to found his own contract research company (Architecture Projects Ltd – APM Ltd), which led projects to develop ANSA, the Advanced Network Systems Architecture. In 1996 he had founded another sister company called Digitivity to develop a product to enable the secure deployment of Java clients for business-to-business applications. Two years later he joined Citrix Systems Inc. following their acquisition of APM and Digitivity to become Director of Advanced Technology. In 2001 he joined Microsoft Research in Cambridge as an assistant director, and became managing director in April 2003. In 2010 he became chairman of Microsoft Research EMEA. He retired from Microsoft in September 2011.

Herbert is a Fellow of the Royal Academy of Engineering, a Fellow of the British Computer Society and a former Liveryman of the City of London Worshipful Company of Information Technologists. He is an Emeritus Fellow of Wolfson College, Cambridge and a member of St John's College, Cambridge.

Herbert was appointed Officer of the Order of the British Empire (OBE) in the 2010 New Year Honours.

Outside of computing, Herbert's interests include flying and restoring vintage aircraft, computer conservation and building scale working models of steam railway locomotives. He owns and operates a 1953 DHC-1 Chipmunk and shares ownership and operation of a DH87b Hornet Moth aircraft.

Now in retirement, Herbert is chairman of trustees for the National Museum of Computing at Bletchley Park. He is also the manager of a project to construct a working replica of the Cambridge EDSAC computer at the museum.

He keeps a working 1967 Elliott 903 computer at his home.

== Work ==
Herbert's research interests include computer networking, operating systems, distributed computing, programming languages and large-scale data driven systems. His most significant research achievements were an operating system for the Cambridge CAP Computer, his contributions to the Cambridge Model Distributed System and the Advanced Networked Systems Architecture.

=== Advanced Networked Systems Architecture ===
The Advanced Networked Systems Architecture (ANSA) was an applied research programme starting in the 1980s as part of the UK Alvey Programme. ANSA aimed to develop a distributed systems software architecture to support applications integration in enterprise-wide systems. The ANSA work included support for interactive multi-media services, object technology for World Wide Web applications, distributed systems management, mobile object systems and security for electronic commerce. ANSA was an early example of what became known as 'middleware'.

In the 1990s "ANSAWare" software based on the ANSA architecture was used by many organisations ahead of the widespread availability of commercial, CORBA-based products for distributed computing. Notable successes included the NASA Astrophysics Data System (ADS), a European radio pager system and the online customer service system for a major UK utility. As part of his ANSA work, Herbert played an active role in many standards and consortia for distributed computing including TINA-C, RM-ODP, OSF DCE and OMG CORBA.

Herbert created a Cambridge UK company, called Architecture Projects Management Ltd (APM), to employ the ANSA research team. As ANSA matured, APM developed a parallel software consulting business to help companies adopt ANSA ideas and use ANSAware, CORBA, and Internet technologies. A key development during this period was E2S, a smart card-based architecture for end-to-end secure business-to-business transactions. In 1996 APM spun out further business called Digitivity, with offices in Cambridge UK and Palo Alto, California, USA to develop a web browser security product. In 1998 APM and Digitivity were acquired by Citrix Systems of Ft Lauderdale, Florida, USA and Herbert took up the position of Director for Advanced Technologies where he remained until joining Microsoft in 2001.

== Publications ==
Herbert published several books and articles, a selection:

- 1979. The Cambridge CAP Computer and Its Operating System. With Maurice Wilkes and Roger Needham (ed.)
- 1984. Cambridge distributed computing system. With Roger Needham
- 2004. Computer systems : theory, technology, and applications : a tribute to Roger Needham . With Karen Spärck Jones (ed.)
