= Computer Science Tripos =

Undergraduate degree in Computer Science offered by the University of Cambridge

Computer Science Tripos (CST)
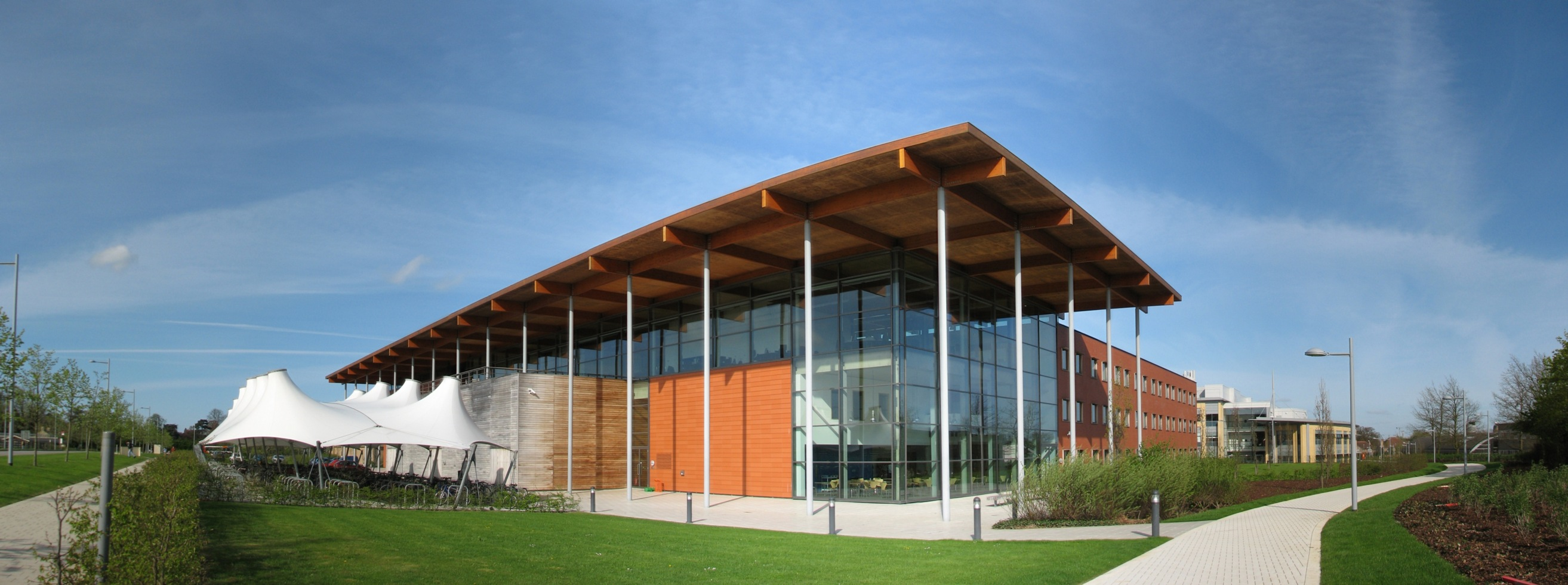
- Some courses of the Computer Science Tripos are taught in the William Gates Building, Cambridge, home of the Computer Laboratory, University of Cambridge
- Type: Bachelor of Arts (BA) degree; Master of Engineering (MEng) degree
- Skills tested: Computer Science
- Duration: 3 or 4 years
- Regions: University of Cambridge
- Languages: English language
- based on: Tripos; Cambridge Diploma in Computer Science
- Website: www.undergraduate.study.cam.ac.uk/courses/computer-science-ba-hons-meng

The Computer Science Tripos (CST) is the undergraduate course in computer science offered by the University of Cambridge Computer Laboratory. It evolved out of the Diploma in Computer Science, the world's first taught course in computer science, which started in 1953. Successful candidates are awarded a Bachelor of Arts (BA) honours degree after three years or, a combined BA + Master of Engineering (MEng) honours degree after four years of study, though admission to the fourth year is usually contingent on attaining a first-class result in the third year.

== Notable alumni ==
- Aubrey de Grey
- Demis Hassabis
- Simon Tatham
