= The Preparation of Programs for an Electronic Digital Computer =

First book on computer programming (1951)

- The cover of the second edition, 1957
- Author: Maurice Wilkes; David Wheeler; Stanley Gill
- Language: English
- Subject: Computer programming
- Publisher: Addison-Wesley
- Publication date: 1951
- Publication place: United States
- OCLC: 475783493

The Preparation of Programs for an Electronic Digital Computer (sometimes called WWG, after its authors' initials) was the first book on computer programming. Published in 1951, it was written by Maurice Wilkes, David Wheeler, and Stanley Gill of Cambridge University. The book was based on the authors' experiences constructing and using EDSAC, one of the first practical computers in the world.

== Contents ==
=== Overview ===
It was the first book to describe a number of important concepts in programming, including:

- the first account of a library of reusable code
- the first API
- the first explanation of using a memory dump for debugging a program, which the book called a "post-mortem routine"
- the first use of the term "assembly" in programming, though with a somewhat different meaning than the modern use of the term

Much of the book is dedicated to explaining the library. This consisted of eighty-eight subroutines implementing mathematical operations like the calculation of trigonometric functions and arithmetic operations on complex numbers. The library was a physical collection stored in a filing cabinet containing punched paper tape encoding the subroutines. This included a "library catalog" describing how a programmer could use each subroutine; today this is called API documentation.

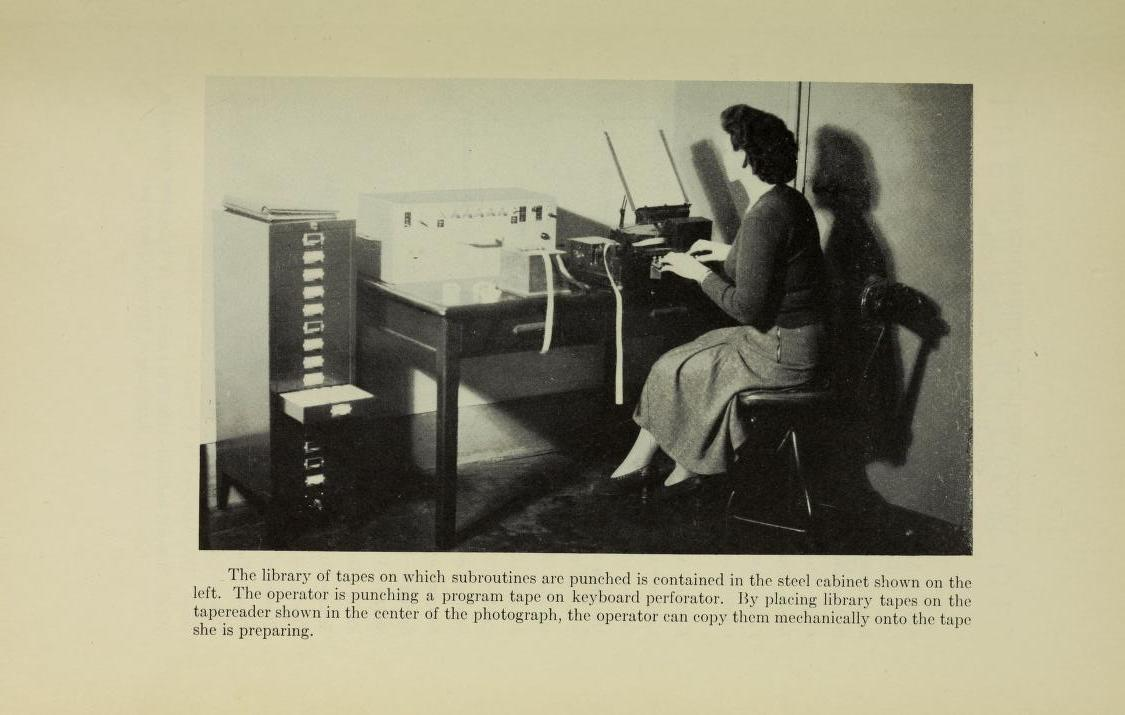
A computer operator working next to a filing cabinet containing the subroutine library for the EDSAC computer.

=== Part one ===
==== Chapter 6 - Debugging ====
This chapter extensively investigates "proofreading" and location of the mistakes in the programs. It also advises against frequent refactoring as it introduces more mistakes as programmer tries to improve the program.

==== Chapter 7 - Examples of programs for EDSAC ====
Includes examples of calculations of e^{-sinx} formula and definite integral, integration of ordinary differential equations, and evaluation of the Fourier transform by using EDSAC programs.

==== Chapter 8 - Automatic programming ====
discusses an assembling (compiling) and interpretation of a program, it also discusses motivation behind "floating addresses" which are, in modern terms, variable references (akin to C++ variable references) which are replaced by compiler by a real memory addresses on the fly every time the subroutine is invoked.

=== Part two ===
This part contains mostly specification on the EDSAC's standard library's subroutines. Among included are subroutines for floating-point, complex numbers, debugging, exponential calculations, integration, differential arithmetic equations, logarithms, quadrature, and trigonometric subroutines.

== Publication history ==
The 1951 book was a mass-printed version of a report titled Report on the Preparation of Programmes for the EDSAC and the Use of the Library of Subroutines written in September 1950 for private circulation and distributed to no more than 100 people. Though written in England, the book was published by Addison-Wesley in the United States.

At the time WWG was published there were very few digital computers in the world. EDSAC, on which the book was based, was the first computer in the world to provide a practical computing service for researchers. Demand for the book was so limited initially that it took six years to sell out the first edition. As computers became more common in the 1950s, the book became the standard textbook on programming for a time. The second edition was printed in 1957. By that time, technology had advanced to the point that WWG was somewhat outdated.

Though WWG was the first published, book-length treatment of computer programming, it was not the first writing on the topic. The subject of programming had been pioneered by Ada Lovelace more than a century prior. It had also been written about more recently by John von Neumann, whose EDVAC Report of 1945 initially inspired Wilkes to create EDSAC.
