= TINA-C =

TINA-C stands for Telecommunication Information Networking Architecture Consortium. It was an attempt (started in 1992) by several actors in the telecommunication world to define, design and realize a software architecture for the telecommunication infrastructure. The consortium has defined a number of specifications and has organized several experiments and demos.

TINA-C is partly based on the Advanced Networked Systems Architecture (ANSA) standard developed by Andrew Herbert.

From 1993-1997 TINA specifications where developed by a core team of experts residing in Red Bank, New Jersey. Core team members were employees of the member companies assigned to work for the consortium. From 1998-2000 the consortium consisted of a Technical Architecture Board that met frequently, with work being conducted in several working groups.

The consortium disbanded in 2000.

== Member Companies ==
The following organizations were at one time members of TINA-C:

- Alcatel
- Alcatel
- AT&T
- Bellcore
- BT
- Deutsche Telekom
- DEC
- Ericsson
- France Telecom
- GPT
- HP
- IBM
- Korea Telecom
- KPN
- Lucent
- Nippon Telegraph and Telephone
- Nokia
- Siemens
- SPRINT
- STL research lab for Nortel Networks
- Telefonica
- Telecom Italia / CSELT
- Telstra
- Telenor

== Bibliography ==
- Appeldorn, Menso, Roberto Kung, and Roberto Saracco. "Tmn+ in= tina." IEEE Communications Magazine 31.3 (1993): 78-85.
