= Neil Dodgson =

Computer scientist

- Born: Neil Anthony Dodgson; 1966 (age 59–60)
- Education: Massey University; University of Cambridge
- Known for: Autostereoscopic 3D displays; Subdivision surfaces
- Scientific career
- Fields: Computer Science; Computer graphics; Aesthetic Imaging; Stereoscopic Displays; 3D TV
- Workplaces: University of Cambridge
- Thesis: Image resampling (1992)
- Doctoral advisor: Neil Wiseman
- Website: www.cl.cam.ac.uk/~nad10

Neil Anthony Dodgson is professor of computer graphics at the Victoria University of Wellington. He was previously (until 2016) professor of graphics and imaging in the Computer Laboratory at the University of Cambridge in England, where he worked in the Rainbow Group on computer graphics and interaction.

== Education ==
Dodgson graduated with a Bachelor of Science degree in computer science and physics from Massey University in 1988 and subsequently worked there as a junior lecturer in computer science for one year. He was awarded a Cambridge Commonwealth Trust Prince of Wales Scholarship to study at the University of Cambridge, where he worked on image resampling supervised by Neil Wiseman and graduating with a PhD in 1992.

== Research ==
Dodgson worked for many years on stereoscopic 3D displays, conducting research principally into autostereoscopic methods. He has contributed to several surveys of the field and has been on the committee of the annual Stereoscopic Displays and Applications conference since 2000, co-chairing the conference four times.

With Malcolm Sabin, Dodgson has worked on subdivision surfaces since 2000. Dodgson's team produced the NURBS-compatible subdivision method in 2009.

Dodgson has supervised almost twenty research students for PhDs.

== Personal life ==
Dodgson also takes an interest in abstract art.

== See also ==
- Mathematics and art
