= Datakit =

Telecommunications infrastructure

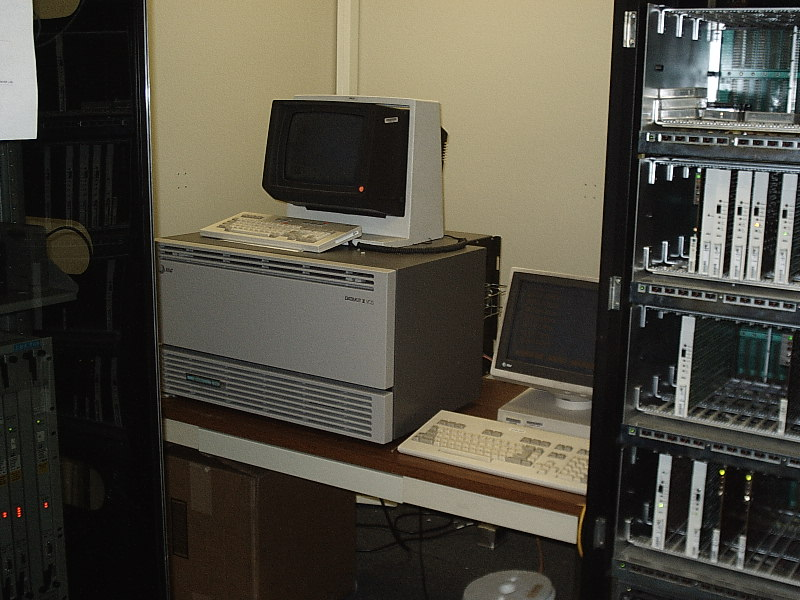
A one-shelf datakit.

In telecommunications, a Datakit is a virtual circuit switch developed by Sandy Fraser at Bell Labs for both local-area and wide-area networks.

== Designing ==
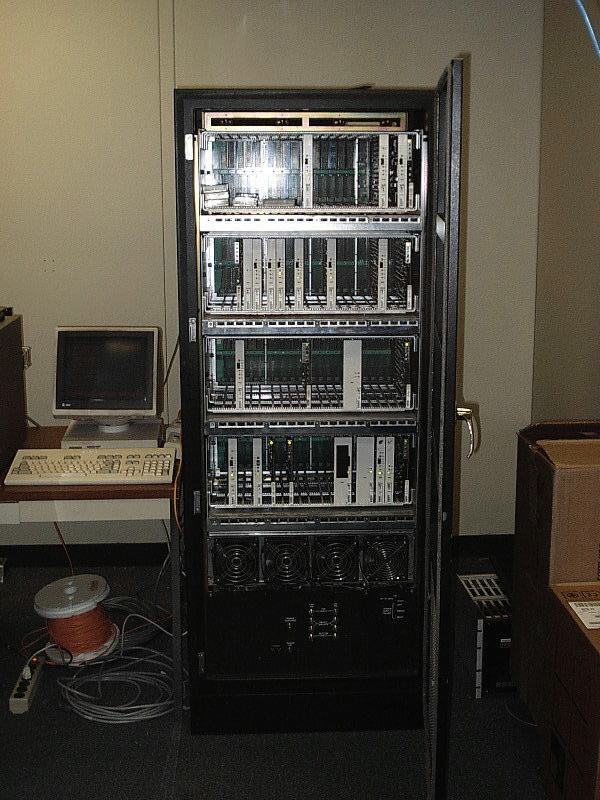
A full datakit approx. 19 in. wide by 5 ft. tall.

A complete Datakit system measures approximately 19 inches wide and 5 feet tall. Datakit employs a cell relay protocol similar to Asynchronous Transfer Mode. (ATM). It is a connection-oriented switch, meaning that all data packets for a given call travel through the network using the same virtual circuit.

Datakit interfaces include TCP/IP, UDP, X.25, asynchronous protocols, as well as several synchronous protocols such as SDLC, HDLC, and Bisync These networks support a range of functions, including host-to-terminal communication, terminal-to-host communication, host-to-host traffic, file transfers, remote login, printing, and command execution. At the physical layer, Datakit operates over diverse media, ranging from slow-speed EIA-232 connections to high-speed 500 Mbps fiber optic links, including 10/100 Mbps Ethernet links.

An adaptation protocol known as the Universal Receiver Protocol (URP) is utilized by Datakit. URP spreads protocol data unit (PDU) overhead across multiple cells and processes packets immediately. It assumes that cells arrive in the correct order; if they do not, it may force retransmissions.

The Information Systems Network (ISN), developed by AT&T Information Systems, was a precursor to Datakit. ISN was a packet-switching network similar to the System 75 digital platform. For both LAN and WAN applications, ISN used devices called concentrators, which connected via fiber optics over distances of up to 15 miles. Speeds on these connections ranged from 1200 to 5600 baud, with most end-users relying on dumb terminals. Early support for ISN and Datakit came from the National Customer Support Center (NCSC) in Englewood, Colorado, before being handled by AT&T Information Systems after company restructuring and support from Bell Labs.

== History ==
Bell Laboratories relied heavily on Datakit for internal networking. On top of Datakit’s transport services, several operating systems, including UNIX, implemented UUCP for email and remote login through dkcu (Datakit-based cu).

Datakit’s design was similar to a telephone central office, using an area code plus a seven-digit numbering system. It was in production for at least three years before its full release.

In 1996, AT&T rebranded Bell Labs as Lucent Technologies, which later merged with the French company Alcatel to become Alcatel-Lucent. Nokia ultimately acquired the company in 2016. By the late 1990s, Datakit was considered legacy technology and was gradually replaced by newer technologies such as IP and Ethernet. Lucent discontinued the Datakit product line, but a group of former employees formed Datatek Applications. Datatek licensed the technology from Lucent to support remaining Datakit users and to provide gateway solutions for transitioning to modern networks. However, due to a steady decline in Datakit users, Datatek Applications ceased operations in January 2018.

== See also ==
- Cell relay
- X.25
