= Cambridge Diploma in Computer Science =

Diploma in Computer Science, originally known as the Diploma in Numerical Analysis and Automatic Computing, was a conversion course in computer science offered by the University of Cambridge. It is equivalent to a master's degree in present-day nomenclature but the title diploma was retained for historic reasons, "diploma" being the archaic term for a master's degree.

The diploma was the world's first full-year taught course in computer science, starting in 1953. It attracted students of mathematics, science and engineering. It was renamed Diploma in Computer Science in 1965. At its peak, there were 50 students on the course. UK government (EPSRC) funding was withdrawn in 2001 and student numbers dropped dramatically. In 2007, the university decided to withdraw the diploma at the end of the 2007–2008 academic year, after 55 years of service.

== History ==
The introduction of this one-year graduate course was motivated by a University of Cambridge Mathematics Faculty Board Report on the "demand for postgraduate instruction in numerical analysis and automatic computing … [which] if not met, there is a danger that the application to scientific research of the machines now being built will be hampered". The University of Cambridge Computer Laboratory "was one of the pioneers in the development and use of electronic computing-machines [sic]". It had introduced a Summer School in 1950, but the Report noted that "The Summer School deals [only] with 'programming', rather than the general theory of the numerical methods which are programmed." The Diploma "would include theoretical and practical work … [and also] instruction about the various types of computing-machine … and the principles of design on which they are based." With only a few students initially, no extra staff would be needed.

University-supported teaching and research staff in the Laboratory at the time were Maurice Wilkes (head of the laboratory), J. C. P. Miller, W. Renwick, E. N. Mutch, and S. Gill, joined slightly later by C. B. Haselgrove.

In its final incarnation, the Diploma was a 10-month course, evaluated two-thirds on examination and one-third on a project dissertation. Most of the examined courses were shared by the second year ("Part IB") of the undergraduate Computer Science Tripos course, with some additional lectures specifically for the Diploma students and four of the third year undergraduate ("Part II") lecture courses also included.

There were three grades of result from the Diploma: distinction (roughly equivalent to first-class honours), pass (equivalent to second or third-class honours), and fail.

== Notable alumni ==
- Samson Abramsky
- Ian Bell
- Steve Bourne
- Ann Copestake
- Lee Hsien Loong
- Stan Kelly-Bootle
- Simon Peyton Jones
- Martin Richards
- Simon Tatham
- Bill Thompson
- Eben Upton
