= Ian Lewis (computer scientist) =

British computer scientist

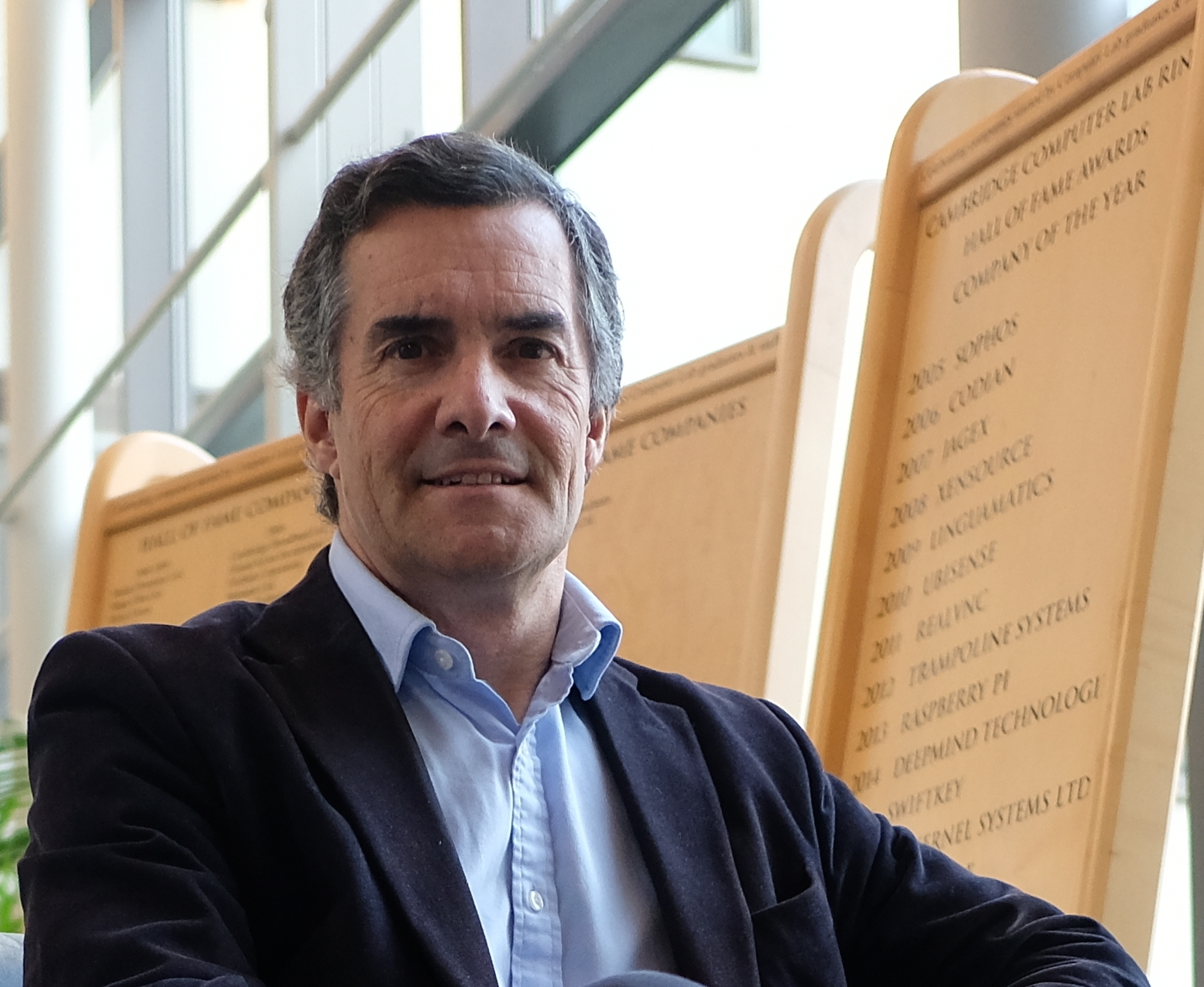
- Ian Lewis at the Computer Laboratory, University of Cambridge
- Born: 7 February 1961 (age 65); Southampton, England
- Education: Queen Mary University of London (BSc); Computer Laboratory, University of Cambridge (PhD)
- Spouse: Mary Forster-Lewis
- Scientific career
- Fields: Computer technology
- Workplaces: University of Cambridge Girton College, Cambridge
- Thesis: PrologPF: Parallel Logic and Functions on the Delphi Machine (1998)
- Doctoral advisor: William Clocksin
- Website: www.cl.cam.ac.uk/~ijl20

Ian Lewis (born 1961) is an American computer scientist who is the director of infrastructure investment for the University of Cambridge and previously the director of the University of Cambridge Computing Service from 2005 to 2014

== Early life and education ==
Lewis was born in Bradford. He earned a Bachelor of Science degree from the Queen Mary University of London and a PhD at the Department of Computer Science and Technology, University of Cambridge.

== Career ==
Lewis started his career in 1983 at IBM. He later worked at Morgan Stanley and Dresdner Kleinwort before becoming global CIO for Investment Banking at Merrill Lynch. He returned to the University of Cambridge in 2005 as the fourth director of the University Computing Service since its establishment as the Mathematical Laboratory in 1949. He was a member of the board of Computacenter from 2006 to 2013 and was also a board member for JANET between 2007 and 2011.

He lived in New York City for 10 years, including the extended period of recovery of the World Financial Center associated with the September 11 attacks in 2001. During the attacks, he assisted victims in the Winter Garden Atrium before moving to a prepared Merrill Lynch disaster command center in Jersey City.

In 2007, he was appointed an Honorary Commander of the United States Air Force.
