= Neil Wiseman =

British computer scientist

- Born: 19 May 1934; Cowlinge, Suffolk, England
- Died: 13 June 1995 (aged 61); Cambridge, England
- Education: University of Cambridge (PhD); University of Illinois (MEng); Queen Mary College (BSc)
- Scientific career
- Fields: Computer Scientist
- Workplaces: University of Cambridge
- Doctoral students: Peter Robinson; Neil Dodgson

[[

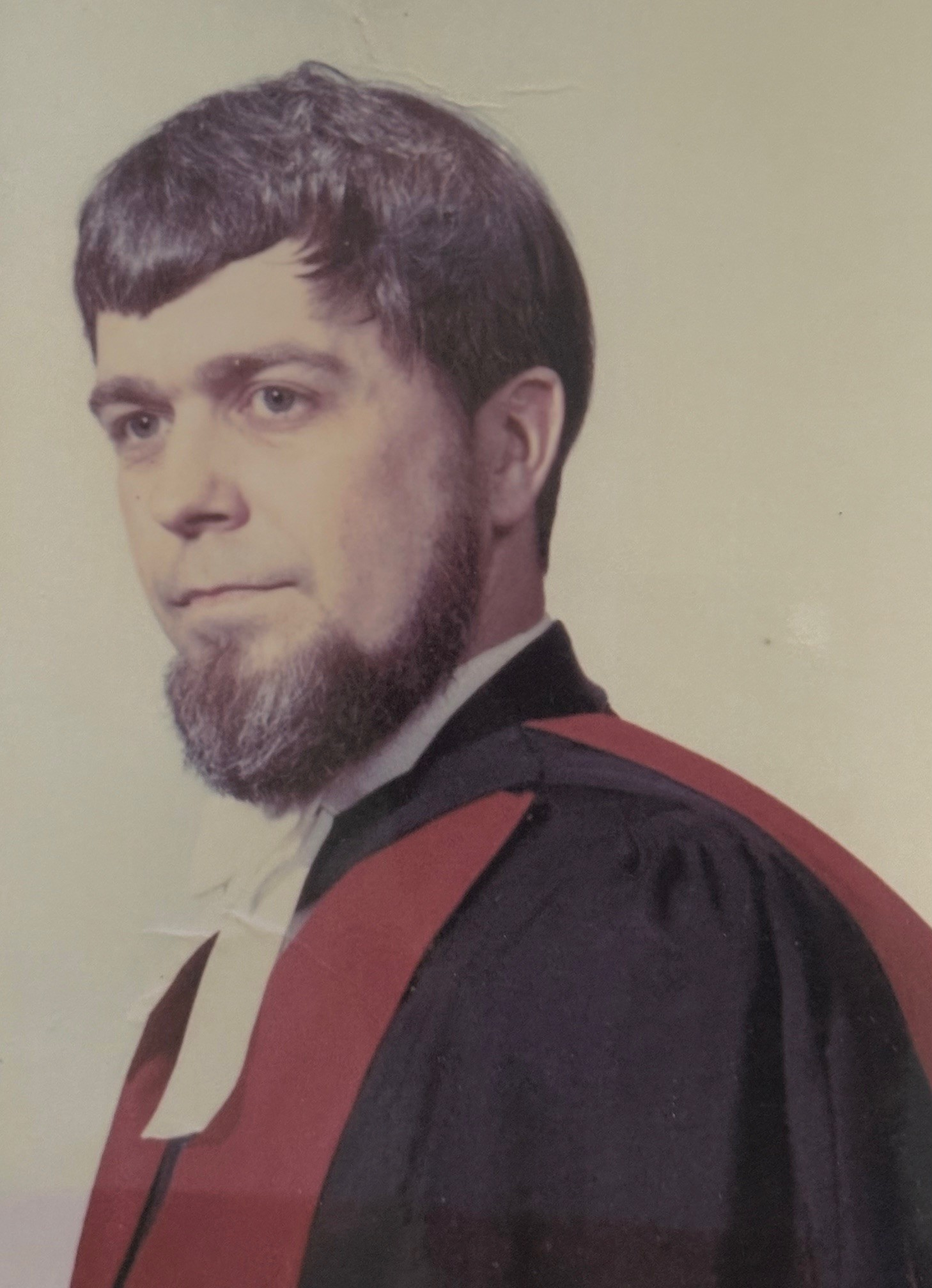
Neil Ernest Wiseman, British computer scientist

|thumb|Neil Wiseman]]

Neil Ernest Wiseman (19 May 1934 – 13 June 1995) was a British computer scientist. Wiseman's pioneering research in computer graphics began in 1965, and resulted in a number of inventions and patents. These included a pen-following screen menu, which anticipated the pop-up menu, and one of the first systems for distributed Computer Graphics. His work brought him three patents, over 70 research publications, and more than 40 students who gained PhDs. In 1986 the Computer Laboratory appointed him to a personal Readership in computer graphics.

== Education and early life ==
Born in Cowlinge near Newmarket, Suffolk, Wiseman joined the Pye electronics company in Cambridge as an apprentice in 1950. 1954–1957 he studied for a BSc (Eng) degree in electrical engineering at Queen Mary College, University of London. During this time he started working for the Mathematical Laboratory, Cambridge during his vacations, e.g. on the construction of a high speed photo-electric paper tape reader. His ability recognised, arrangements were made for him to spend two years at the University of Illinois to study for a master's degree in electrical engineering (awarded 1959). Here he worked as a research assistant in the Digital Computer Laboratory on the design of circuits for the new Illinois computer. On his return to Britain his call-up for National Service was deferred to enable him to take employment with Elliott Brothers (London) Ltd at Borehamwood, Hertfordshire – on behalf of the Ministry of Aviation. He worked for two years at Elliott Brothers as research engineer in charge of the advanced circuits and logical techniques group in the Data Processing Laboratory. It was here that he started working with tunnel diodes, which showed great promise as a high-speed technology.

== Career ==
In 1961 after ten years of intermittent contact Wiseman joined the staff of the University Mathematical Laboratory, Cambridge, now the University of Cambridge Computer Laboratory, as Chief Engineer. He continued working with tunnel diodes and constructed a prototype store capable of running at 250 megahertz, a phenomenal speed for the time. The arrival of one of the world's first mini-computers, the DEC PDP-7 and its type 340 vector display, presented new challenges. Wiseman designed a high-speed data-link to connect this to the main Titan computer, which probably counts as the world's first distributed system. It proved a valuable research tool for work on computer aided design, both for mechanical components and for his own work on electronic circuits. The Rainbow integrated CAD system combined electronic design, computer graphics, data structures and the control of change in large bodies of data. He also began work on screen editors for text and later a television camera was connected to the PDP-7.

In 1970 Wiseman was approved for a PhD through the submission of published work and was appointed to a University Lectureship. He was immediately seconded to the Cambridge University Press where he employed his experiences with PDP-7 display in a project to design and implement a computerised type-setting system. Returning to the Computer Laboratory in 1973 he resumed his work on the Rainbow integrated CAD system with the new PDP-11 computer and Vector General display. He attracted a great number of PhD students who went on to academic posts around the world and in research laboratories in Britain and especially on the West coast of America. In the 1970s he collaborated with David Kindersley MBE in the exploration of the mathematics underlying the aesthetics of lettering. Towards the end of 1977 he set up a consultancy company Fendragon Ltd with Kindersley and J. Harradine as directors (later joined by M.J. Jordan and P. Robinson), which operated in text processing and related areas.

Research in the Computer Laboratory developed with the Rainbow display project, which combined Wiseman's interests in electronic design and computer graphics. He ran the Diploma course in computer science, looked after general graduate admissions and played a key role in the establishment of the hardware laboratory for undergraduate practical work. He declined offers of chairs at other universities, preferring to remain in Cambridge. In 1983 he became a Fellow of Wolfson College and in 1986 a personal Readership in Computer Graphics was created for him. He died of cancer on 13 June 1995 after a year's illness.
