= Real Time Club =

- Formation: 1967; 59 years ago
- Founder: Alan Marshall
- Type: Nonprofit society
- Purpose: Create debate and enabling interested people to meet one another
- Location: London, United Kingdom
- Services: Series of dinners with speakers and debates
- Chairman: John Collins
- Website: realtimeclub.co.uk

The Real Time Club is a networking society for professionals with interest in IT and technology. The club is based in London and organises an annual dinner series with speakers on a wide range of topics from Information and communications technology (ICT), technology and science.

== History ==
The Real Time Club (RTC) was founded as dining club in the 1960s by US American IT entrepreneur Alan Marshall. For the first 25 years of its existence the Real Time Club dined at numerous London restaurants, but dinners are now usually held at the National Liberal Club in Whitehall. The club celebrated its 45th anniversary in 2013 with a charity dinner hosted by Lord Lucas at the House of Lords.

The founding members of the Real Time Club were entrepreneurs and early IT professionals. In its early years the Real Time Club engaged actively in lobbying and policy making to help setting the scene for a thriving IT industry in the UK. Consequently politicians, civil servants and members of the media became regular attendees at the club dinners as the club engaged with Parliament and media. The RTC published a number of influential reports and engaged with parliamentary committees.

As part of its effort to foster a successful technology sector in the UK, the Real Time Club also took a keen interest in IT education in school and university. Education and skilled workforce remain a reoccurring topic at the club's dinners, and the club supports various initiatives through its members or through direct sponsorship, including hack days for children and experimentation with 3D printing. While individual members keep engaged in policy making, the club's focus has shifted away from lobbying. Today the Real Time Club sees itself primarily as networking society and debating platform.

The club's old logo (before 2007).

The club always had a strong connection to London's City which it maintains to this day. The founding members were entrepreneurs who turned to the financial institutions for venture capital and as clients for their early network applications. The early themes of venture capital and entrepreneurship were soon complemented with international competitiveness and national infrastructure. Recently, high performance computing, security and system integrity are topics that draw a growing number of IT professionals from the finance sector, entrepreneurs and investors to the RTC dinners.

== Name ==
The Real Time Club takes its name from the real-time and time-sharing computing systems that the club's founders were pioneering at the time. Today the club covers a much larger range of interests. The club now sees the "real time" in its name as referring to the currentness and cutting edge nature of topics discussed in the club.

== Dinner programme ==
Every year the Real Time Club runs a series of dinners with speakers on a broad range of topics related to technology. Meetings are held under the Chatham House Rule and a robust debate is explicitly encouraged. Although for the first 25 years of its existence the RTC dined at numerous London restaurants, dinners are now usually held at the National Liberal Club. There are around six to eight dinners a year. The Real Time Club dinners are open to non-members.

== Membership ==
The membership procedures of the club has changed several times over the history of the club. Initially, access to the club was by invitation only. As of 2013 club membership is open to all regular dinner attendees.

== Connections and influence ==
Through its members and in particular through the club council and the club officers, the Real Time Club maintains personal connection to a range of IT institutions and organisations. Similarly, the club maintains connections to the media, in particular through industry publications such as Computer Weekly and The Register. Over the years various special interest groups developed within the RTC, some of which have spun off specialist organisations such as the Brain Mind Forum.

A selection of offices held by former RTC chairmen: Geoff McMullen and Stanley Gill served as president of the British Computer Society. Charles Hughes held office at the Worshipful Company of Information Technologists. Basil Cousins co-founded OpenForum Europe. Philip Virgo is Chairman of the Conservative Technology Forum and was a founding officer at the Parliamentary Information Technology Committee (PITCOM). Lord Harry Renwick also held office at PITCOM and is President of EURIM.

== Chairmen ==
- John Collins (current chairman)
- Geoff McMullen (2011–2013)
- Maury Shenk (2010–2011)
- Michael Mainelli (2009–2010)
- Mark Holford (2008–2009)
- Trish Boag (2007–2008)
- Philip Virgo (2006–2007)
- Rob Wirszycz (2005–2006)
- Harry the Lord Renwick (2004–2005)
- John Gallop (2003–2004)
- Charles Ross (2001–2003)
- Charles Hughes (1999–2001)
- John O’Sullivan (1997–1999)
- Basil Cousins (1996–1997)
- Bryan Mills (1993–1995)
- William Freyenfeld (1981–1993)
- Bryan Mills (1978–1981)
- Reay Atkinson (1975–1978)
- Stanley Gill (1970–1975)
- Alan Marshall (1967–1970)
