= Peter Robinson (computer scientist) =

British computer scientist

- Born: 1952 (age 73–74); England
- Education: Gonville and Caius College, Cambridge
- Known for: video user interfaces affective computing
- Scientific career
- Fields: Computer Scientist
- Workplaces: Cambridge University
- Doctoral advisor: Neil Wiseman
- Doctoral students: Rana el Kaliouby; Quentin Stafford-Fraser
- Website: www.cst.cam.ac.uk/people/pr10

Peter Robinson (born 1952) is Professor Emeritus of Computer Technology at the University of Cambridge Computer Laboratory in England, where he works in the Rainbow Group on computer graphics and interaction. He is also a Fellow of Gonville and Caius College and lives in Cambridge.

== Education ==
Robinson graduated with a Bachelor of Arts degree in Mathematics from the University of Cambridge in 1974 and continued with a year of post-graduate study in Mathematics before joining the Computer Laboratory, where he was sponsored by the BBC to work on Graphic Design with Computers under Neil Wiseman and graduated PhD in 1979.

== Research ==
Robinson worked on computer-aided design systems for integrated circuits in the 1980s, undertaking the physical design of the video processor for early BBC computers as a case study. He continued with work on self-timed (asynchronous) circuits and his students Paul Cunningham and Steev Wilcox started Azuro to exploit the ideas in designing low power integrated circuits.

The Rank Xerox Research Centre in Cambridge sponsored several of Robinson's research students in the 1990s to work on video cameras and projection as part of the user interface including Pierre Wellner's DigitalDesk, an early tabletop display featuring tangible interaction and augmented reality and Quentin Stafford-Fraser's work leading to the webcam. Further work investigated augmenting paper documents and high-resolution interactive tabletop displays leading to the commercial nuVa system developed by Thales.

More recently, Robinson has led a team working on affective computing. This has included inference of mental states from facial expressions non-verbal speech and gestures together with the expression of emotions by robots and cartoon avatars. His YouTube video on The emotional computer has resulted in regular television and radio appearances and his student Rana el Kaliouby founded Affectiva with Rosalind Picard to exploit the ideas commercially.

Robinson has supervised over thirty research students for PhDs.
