= EDSAC =

1940s–1950s British computer

Electronic Delay Storage Automatic Calculator (EDSAC)
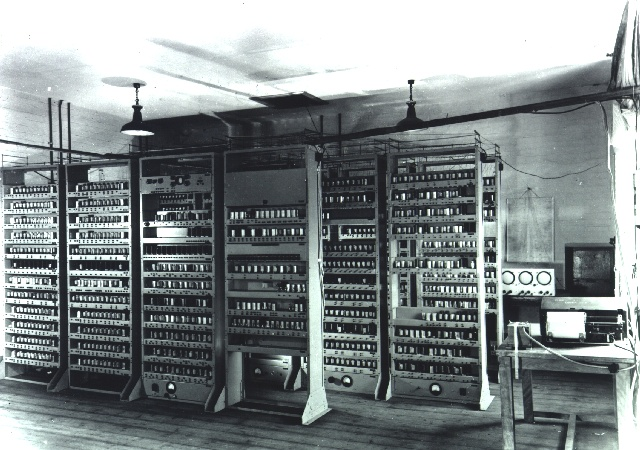
- EDSAC I in June 1948
- Developer: Maurice Wilkes and his team at the University of Cambridge Mathematical Laboratory
- Manufacturer: University of Cambridge
- Generation: 1
- Released: 6 May 1949; 77 years ago
- Lifespan: 1949–1958
- Discontinued: yes
- Units shipped: 1
- Operating system: None
- CPU: Derated thermionic valves
- Memory: 512 17-bit words, upgraded in 1952 to 1024 17-bit words (temperature-stabilized mercury delay lines)
- Display: Teleprinter
- Input: five-hole punched tape
- Power: 11 kW
- Backward compatibility: None
- Successor: EDSAC 2 and LEO I
- Related: EDVAC

The Electronic Delay Storage Automatic Calculator (EDSAC) was an early British computer. Inspired by John von Neumann's seminal First Draft of a Report on the EDVAC, the machine was constructed by Maurice Wilkes and his team at the University of Cambridge Mathematical Laboratory in England to provide a service to the university. EDSAC was the second electronic digital stored-program computer, after the Manchester Mark 1, to go into regular service.

Later the project was supported by J. Lyons & Co. Ltd., intending to develop a commercially applied computer and resulting in Lyons' development of the LEO I, based on the EDSAC design. Work on EDSAC started during 1947, and it ran its first programs on 6 May 1949, when it calculated a table of square numbers and a list of prime numbers. EDSAC was finally shut down on 11 July 1958, having been superseded by EDSAC 2, which remained in use until 1965.

== Project and plan ==
The conception of the EDSAC I can be traced back to 1945, during early planning of the EDVAC. In June of that year, John von Neumann wrote his First Draft of a Report on the EDVAC after taking on a consulting role while J. Presper Eckert and John Mauchly were the designers. The document described the concept of a stored-program computer, where both the program and data are stored in the same memory, which is now known as the Von Neumann architecture; it briefly explains the idea that computer instructions, or the program, could be stored in the same memory as the data, allowing for flexibility and automation in computation.

Later in August 1946, when Wilkes participated in the final weeks of the Moore School Lectures, he was exposed to the principles of the ENIAC – Eckert and Mauchly's previous invention – and their proposed next project, the EDVAC. He proposed the concept of microprogramming, a system that simplifies the logical design of computers, which later became widely adopted in the industry. Using the knowledge he gathered about the EDVAC's working concept in the lectures, he began development of the EDSAC I in October of that year.

== Technical overview ==
=== Physical components ===
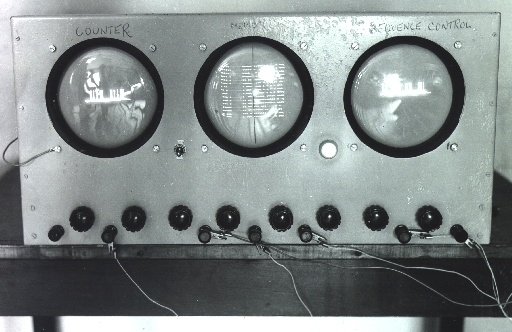
9-inch tubes used for monitoring

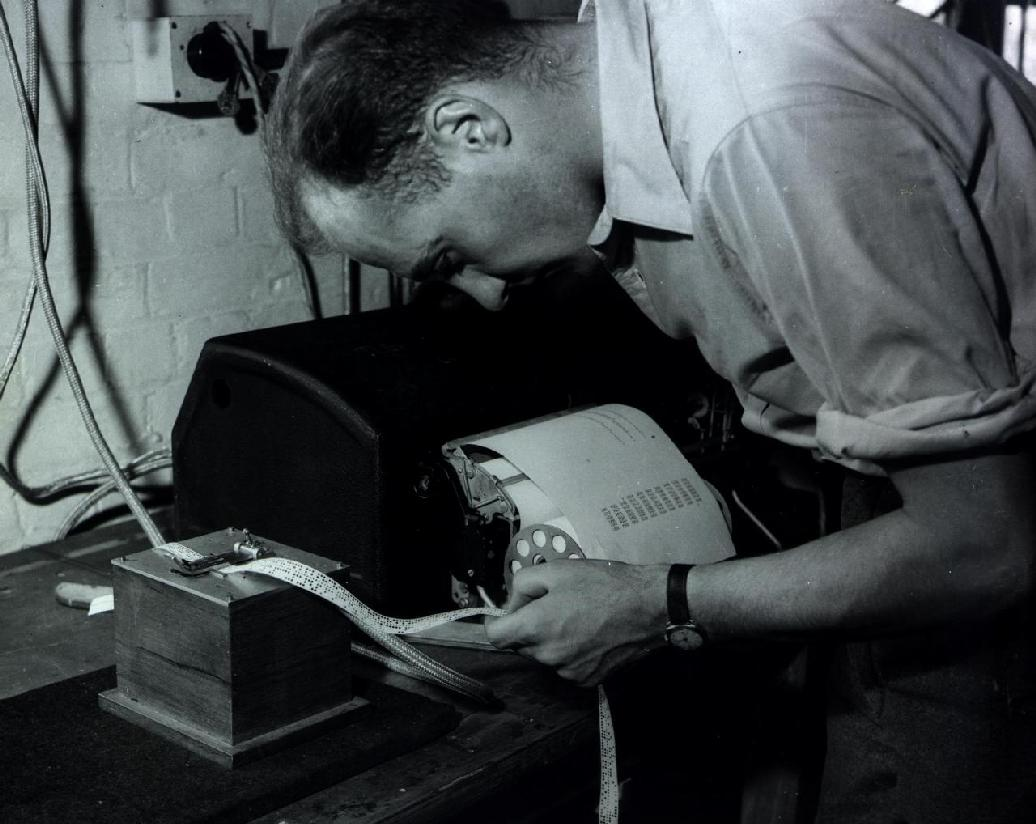
William Renwick with 5-hole tape reader and Creed teleprinter

As soon as EDSAC was operational, it began serving the university's research needs. It used mercury delay lines for memory and derated vacuum tubes for logic. Power consumption was 11 kW of electricity. Cycle time was 1.5 ms for all ordinary instructions, 6 ms for multiplication. Input was via five-hole punched tape, and output was via a teleprinter.

Initially, registers were limited to an accumulator and a multiplier register. In 1953, David Wheeler, returning from a stay at the University of Illinois, designed an index register as an extension to the original EDSAC hardware.

A magnetic-tape drive was added in 1952 but never worked sufficiently well to be of real use.

Until 1952, the available main memory (instructions and data) was only 512 18-bit words, and there was no backing store. The delay lines (or "tanks") were arranged in two batteries providing 512 words each. The second battery came into operation in 1952.

The full 1024-word delay-line store was not available until 1955 or early 1956, limiting programs to about 800 words until then.

John Lindley (diploma student 1958–1959) mentioned "the incredible difficulty we had ever to produce a single correct piece of paper tape with the crude and unreliable home-made punching, printing and verifying gear available in the late 50s".

=== Memory and instructions ===
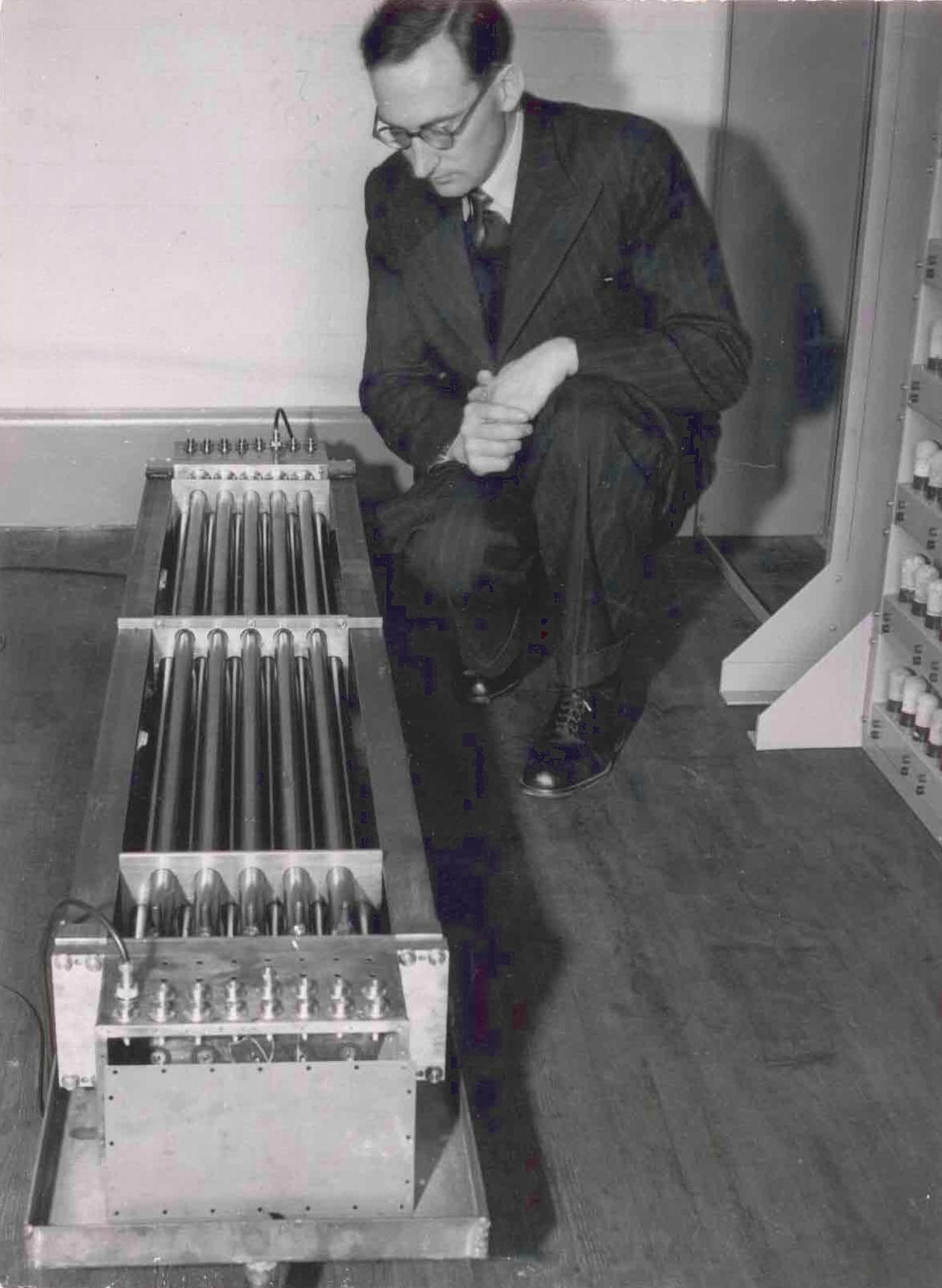
Maurice Wilkes inspecting the mercury delay line of the EDSAC in construction

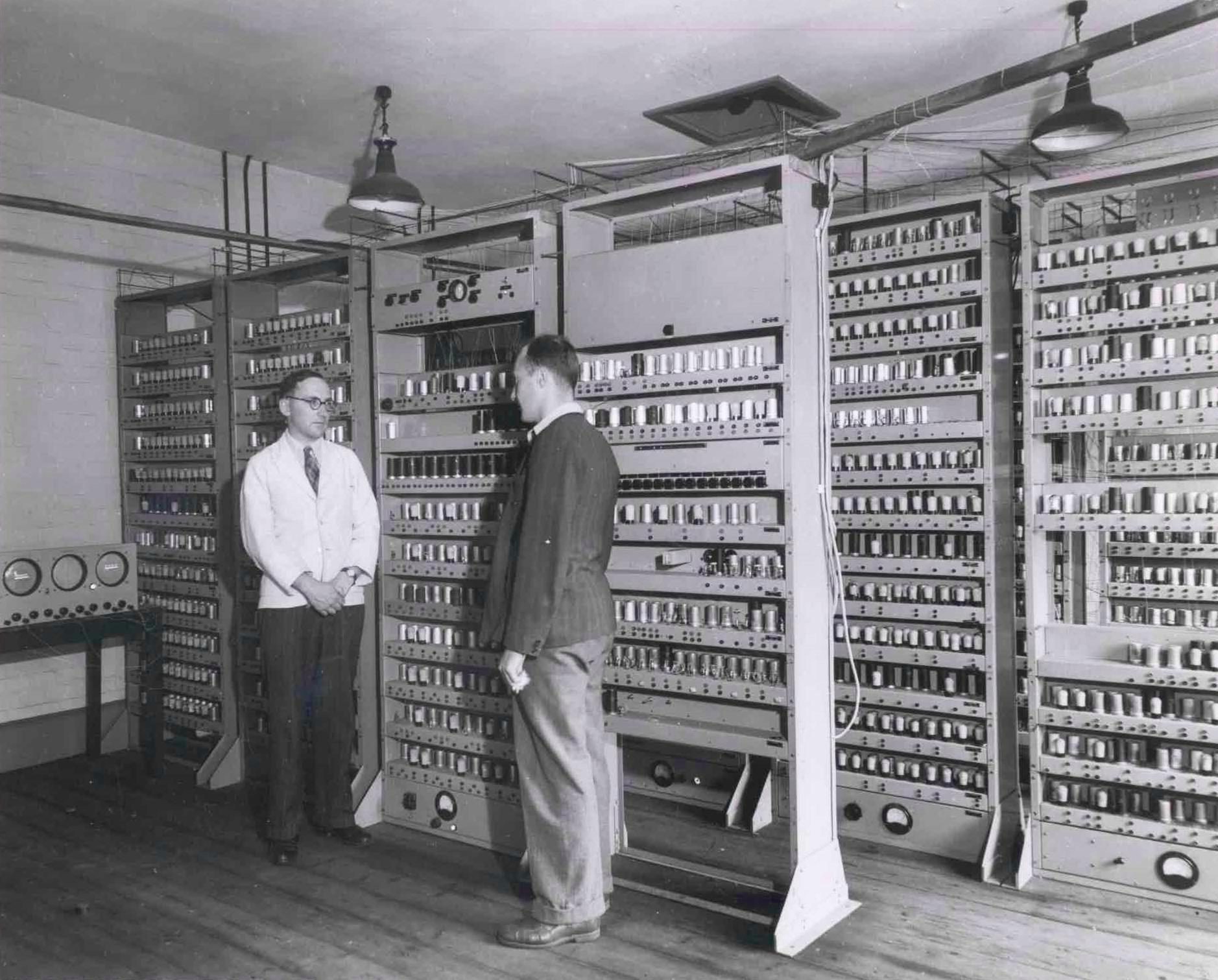
Maurice Wilkes and Bill Renwick in front of the complete EDSAC

The EDSAC's main memory consisted of 1024 locations, though only 512 locations were initially installed. Each contained 18 bits, but the topmost bit was always unavailable due to timing problems, so only 17 bits were used. An instruction consisted of a five-bit instruction code, one spare bit, a 10-bit operand (usually a memory address), and one length bit to control whether the instruction used a 17-bit or a 35-bit operand (two consecutive words, little-endian). All instruction codes were by design represented by one mnemonic letter, so that the Add instruction, for example, used the EDSAC character code for the letter A.

Internally, the EDSAC used two's complement binary numbers. Numbers were either 17 bits (one word) or 35 bits (two words) long. Unusually, the multiplier was designed to treat numbers as fixed-point fractions in the range −1 ≤ x < 1, i.e. the binary point was immediately to the right of the sign. The accumulator could hold 71 bits, including the sign, allowing two long (35-bit) numbers to be multiplied without losing any precision.

The instructions available were:

- Add
- Subtract
- Multiply-and-add
- AND-and-add (called "Collate")
- Shift left
- Arithmetic shift right
- Load multiplier register
- Store (and optionally clear) accumulator
- Conditional goto
- Read input tape
- Print character
- Round accumulator
- No-op
- Stop

There was no division instruction (but various division subroutines were supplied) and no way to directly load a number into the accumulator (a "Store and zero accumulator" instruction followed by an "Add" instruction were necessary for this). There was no unconditional jump instruction, nor was there a procedure call instruction – it had not yet been invented.

Maurice Wilkes discussed relative addressing modes for the EDSAC in a paper published in 1953. He was making the proposals to facilitate the use of subroutines.

=== System software ===
The initial orders were hard-wired on a set of uniselector switches and loaded into the low words of memory at startup. By May 1949, the initial orders provided a primitive relocating assembler taking advantage of the mnemonic design described above, all in 31 words. This was the world's first assembler, and arguably the start of the global software industry. There is a simulation of EDSAC available, and a full description of the initial orders and first programs.

The first calculation done by EDSAC was a program run on 6 May 1949 to compute square numbers. The program was written by Beatrice Worsley, who had travelled from Canada to study the machine.

The machine was used by other members of the university to solve real problems, and many early techniques were developed that are now included in operating systems.

Users prepared their programs by punching them (in assembler) onto a paper tape. They soon became good at being able to hold the paper tape up to the light and read back the codes. When a program was ready, it was hung on a length of line strung up near the paper-tape reader. The machine operators, who were present during the day, selected the next tape from the line and loaded it into EDSAC. This is of course well known today as job queues. If it printed something, then the tape and the printout were returned to the user, otherwise they were informed at which memory location it had stopped. Debuggers were some time away, but a cathode-ray tube screen could be set to display the contents of a particular piece of memory. This was used to see whether a number was converging, for example. A loudspeaker was connected to the accumulator's sign bit; experienced users knew healthy and unhealthy sounds of programs, particularly programs "hung" in a loop.

After office hours certain "authorised users" were allowed to run the machine for themselves, which went on late into the night until a valve blew – which usually happened according to one such user. This is alluded to by Fred Hoyle in his novel The Black Cloud.

=== Programming technique ===
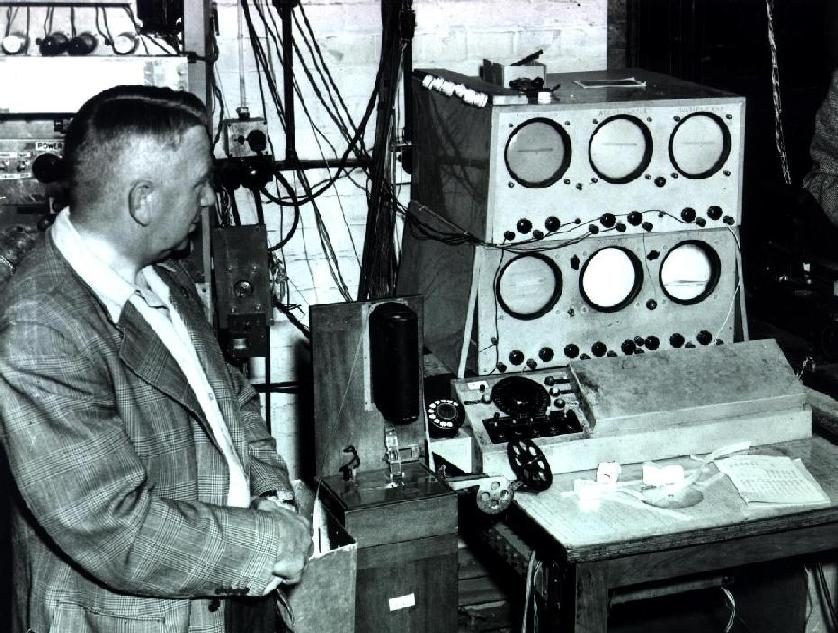
EDSAC monitoring desk

The early programmers had to make use of techniques frowned upon today—in particular, the use of self-modifying code. As there was no index register until much later, the only way of accessing an array was to alter which memory location a particular instruction was referencing.

David Wheeler, who earned the world's first Computer Science PhD working on the project, is credited with inventing the concept of a subroutine. Users wrote programs that called a routine by jumping to the start of the subroutine with the return address (i.e. the location-plus-one of the jump itself) in the accumulator (a Wheeler Jump). By convention the subroutine expected this, and the first thing it did was to modify its concluding jump instruction to that return address. Multiple and nested subroutines could be called so long as the user knew the length of each one in order to calculate the location to jump to; recursive calls were forbidden. The user then copied the code for the subroutine from a master tape onto their own tape following the end of their own program. (However, Alan Turing discussed subroutines in a paper of 1945 on design proposals for the NPL ACE, going so far as to invent the concept of a return-address stack, which would have allowed recursion.)

The lack of an index register also posed a problem to the writer of a subroutine in that they could not know in advance where in memory the subroutine would be loaded, and therefore they could not know how to address any regions of the code that were used for storage of data (so-called "pseudo-orders"). This was solved by use of an initial input routine, which was responsible for loading subroutines from punched tape into memory. On loading a subroutine, it would note the start location and increment internal memory references as required. Thus, as Wilkes wrote, "the code used to represent orders outside the machine differs from that used inside, the differences being dictated by the different requirements of the programmer on the one hand, and of the control circuits of the machine on the other".

EDSAC's programmers used special techniques to make best use of the limited available memory. For example, at the point of loading a subroutine from punched tape into memory, it might happen that a particular constant would have to be calculated, a constant that would not subsequently need recalculation. In this situation, the constant would be calculated in an "interlude". The code required to calculate the constant would be supplied along with the full subroutine. After the initial input routine had loaded the calculation-code, it would transfer control to this code. Once the constant had been calculated and written into memory, control would return to the initial input routine, which would continue to write the remainder of the subroutine into memory, but first adjusting its starting point so as to overwrite the code that had calculated the constant. This allowed quite complicated adjustments to be made to a general-purpose subroutine without making its final footprint in memory any larger than had it been tailored to a specific circumstance.

Wheeler and Wilkes, together with Stanley Gill, published The Preparation of Programs for an Electronic Digital Computer in 1951, a book about programming the EDSAC. It was the first programming textbook.

=== Application software ===
The subroutine concept led to the availability of a substantial subroutine library. By 1951, 87 subroutines in the following categories were available for general use: floating-point arithmetic; arithmetic operations on complex numbers; checking; division; exponentiation; routines relating to functions; differential equations; special functions; power series; logarithms; miscellaneous; print and layout; quadrature; read (input); nth root; trigonometric functions; counting operations (simulating repeat until loops, while loops and for loops); vectors; and matrices.

The first assembly language appeared for the EDSAC, and inspired several other assembly languages:

Year	Name	Chief developer, company
1951	Regional Assembly Language	Maurice Wilkes
1951	Whirlwind assembler	Charles Adams and Jack Gilmore at MIT
1951	Rochester assembler	Nat Rochester

== Applications of EDSAC ==
EDSAC was designed specifically to form part of the Mathematical Laboratory's support service for calculation. Ronald Fisher, in collaboration with Wilkes and Wheeler, used EDSAC to solve a differential equation relating to gene frequencies; this represented the first application of a computer to research in biology. In 1951, Miller and Wheeler used the machine to discover a 79-digit prime – the largest known at the time.

The winners of three Nobel Prizes – John Kendrew and Max Perutz (Chemistry, 1962), Andrew Huxley (Medicine, 1963) and Martin Ryle (Physics, 1974) – benefitted from EDSAC's revolutionary computing power. In their acceptance prize speeches, each acknowledged the role that EDSAC had played in their research.

In the early 1960s Peter Swinnerton-Dyer used the EDSAC computer to calculate the number of points modulo p (denoted by N_{p}) for a large number of primes p on elliptic curves whose rank was known. Based on these numerical results, Birch & Swinnerton-Dyer (1965) conjectured that N_{p} for a curve E with rank r obeys an asymptotic law, the Birch and Swinnerton-Dyer conjecture, considered one of the top unsolved problems in mathematics as of 2024.

The "brain" [computer] may one day come down to our level [of the common people] and help with our income-tax and book-keeping calculations. But this is speculation and there is no sign of it so far.

— British newspaper The Star in a June 1949 news article about the EDSAC computer, long before the era of the personal computers.

=== Games ===
In 1952, Sandy Douglas developed OXO, a version of noughts and crosses (tic-tac-toe) for the EDSAC, with graphical output to a VCR97 6" cathode-ray tube. This may well have been the world's first video game.

Another video game was created by Stanley Gill and involved a dot (termed a sheep) approaching a line in which one of two gates could be opened. The Stanley Gill game was controlled via the lightbeam of the EDSAC's paper-tape reader. Interrupting it (such as by the player placing their hand in it) would open the upper gate. Leaving the beam unbroken would result in the lower gate opening.

== Further developments ==
EDSAC's successor, EDSAC 2, was commissioned in 1958.

In 1961, an EDSAC 2 version of Autocode, an ALGOL-like high-level programming language for scientists and engineers, was developed by David Hartley.

In the mid-1960s, a successor to the EDSAC 2 was planned, but the move was instead made to the Titan, a prototype Atlas 2 developed from the Atlas Computer of the University of Manchester, Ferranti, and Plessey.

== EDSAC Replica Project ==
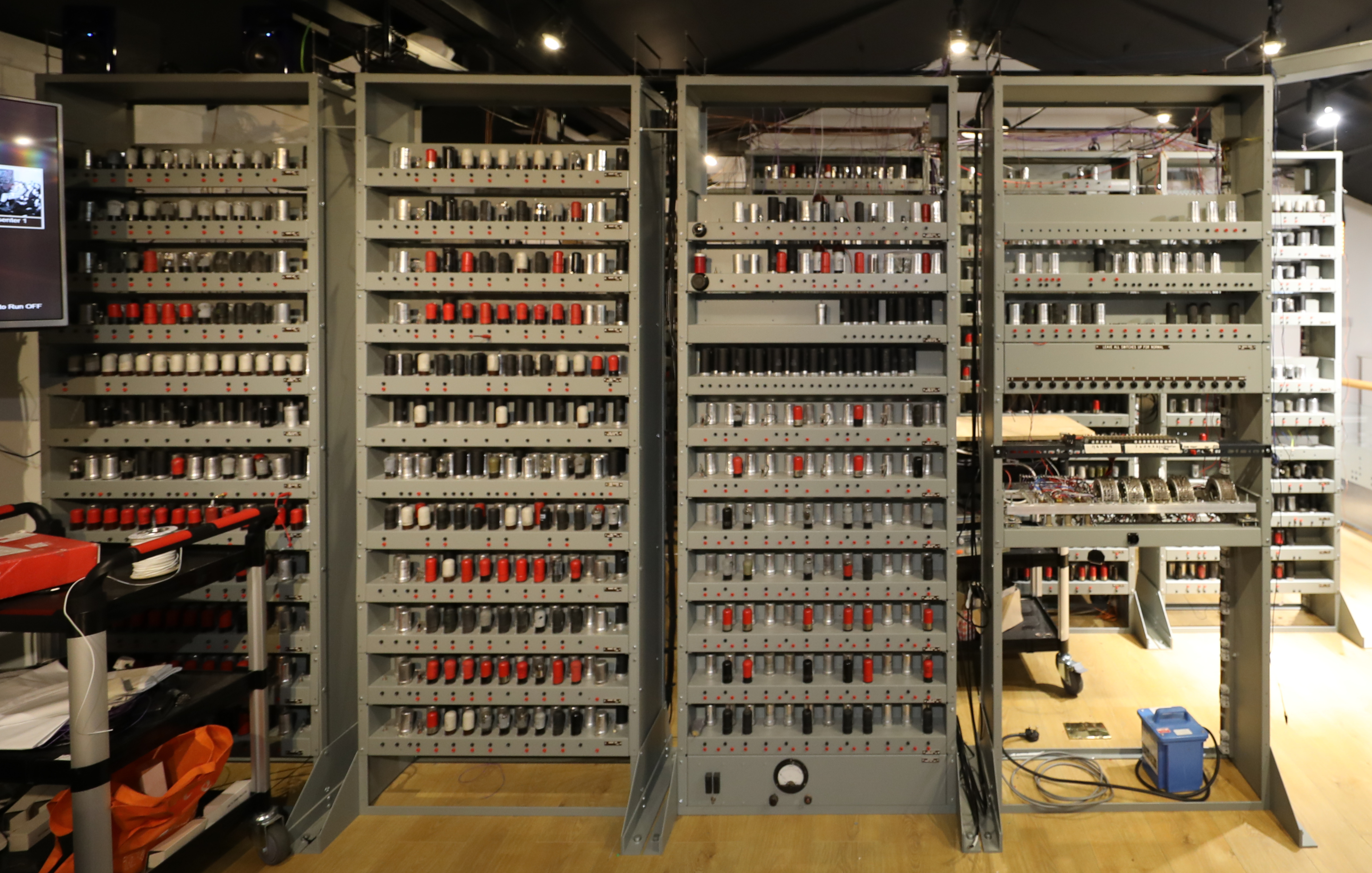
EDSAC replica in October 2018

On 13 January 2011, the Computer Conservation Society announced that it planned to build a working replica of EDSAC, at the National Museum of Computing (TNMoC) on the Bletchley Park campus. The project is led by Andrew Herbert, who studied under Maurice Wilkes. The first parts of the replica were switched on in November 2014. The EDSAC logical circuits were meticulously reconstructed through the development of a simulator and the reexamination of some rediscovered original schematics. This documentation has been released under a Creative Commons license. The ongoing project is open to visitors of the museum. In 2016, two original EDSAC operators, Margaret Marrs and Joyce Wheeler, visited the museum to assist the project. As of November 2016, commissioning of the fully completed and operational state of the replica was estimated to be the autumn of 2017. However, unforeseen project delays have resulted in an unknown date for a completed and fully operational machine.

== See also ==
- EDVAC on which much of the design of EDSAC was based
- History of computing hardware
- Timeline of operating systems
- List of vacuum-tube computers
