= Stanley Gill =

British computer scientist (1926–1975)

Stanley Gill (26 March 1926 – 5 April 1975) was a British computer scientist credited, along with Maurice Wilkes and David Wheeler, with the invention of the first computer subroutine.

== Early life, education and career ==
Stanley Gill was born 26 March 1926 in Worthing, West Sussex, England. He was educated at Worthing High School for Boys and was, during his schooldays, a member of an amateur dramatic society.

In 1943, he was awarded a State Scholarship and went to St John's College, Cambridge, where he read Mathematics/Natural Sciences. He graduated BA in 1947 and MA in 1950. Gill worked at the National Physical Laboratory from 1947 to 1950, where he met his wife, Audrey Lee, whom he married in 1949. From 1952 to 1955 he was a Research Fellow at St John's working in a team led by Maurice Wilkes; the research involved pioneering work with the EDSAC computer in the Cavendish Laboratory. In 1952, he developed a very early computer game. It involved a dot (termed a sheep) approaching a line in which one of two gates could be opened. The game was controlled via the lightbeam of the EDSAC's paper tape reader. Interrupting it (such as by the player placing their hand in it) would open the upper gate. Leaving the beam unbroken would result in the lower gate opening.

He gained a PhD in 1953 and, following a year as Visiting Assistant Professor at the University of Illinois, Urbana, joined the Computer Department at Ferranti Ltd. In the UK in 1963 he was appointed Professor of Automatic Data Processing, UMIST, Manchester and, following various consultancies including International Computers Ltd he was appointed in 1964 to the newly created Chair of Computing Science and Computing Unit at Imperial College, University of London. This was later merged into the Imperial College Centre for Computing and Automation, which Gill became director of, whilst he worked as a consultant to the Ministry of Technology. Gill was a founding member of the Real Time Club in 1967 and its chairman from 1970 to 1975. In 1970 he became Chairman of Software Sciences Holdings Ltd and was Director of various companies in the Miles Roman Group. From 1972 until his death in 1975 he was Senior Consultant to PA International Management Consultants Ltd.

Gill travelled widely and advised on the establishment of departments of computing in several universities around the world. He was also President of the British Computer Society from 1967 to 1968.

== Publications ==
- The Preparation of Programs for an Electronic Digital Computer by Maurice Wilkes, David Wheeler, and Stanley Gill; (original 1951); reprinted with new introduction by Martin Campbell-Kelly; 198 pp.; ISBN 0-262-23118-2. Available through Charles Babbage Institute Archive.org Full Text
- Papers of Professor Stanley Gill 1964-1971, Imperial College Archives and Corporate Records Unit, Room 455, Sherfield Building, Imperial College, London, UK.
- Gill, Stanley. Second Progress Report on the Automatic Computing Engine, National Physical Laboratory, Mathematics Division. (1949)
- Gill, Stanley. A process for the step-by-step integration of differential equations in an automatic digital computing machine. Proc. Camb. Phil. Soc, v. 47, p. 96 (1951). [The Runge-Kutta-Gill method.] https://doi.org/10.1017/S0305004100026414
- Gill, Stanley. The diagnosis of mistakes in programmes on the EDSAC. Proc. Roy. Soc. A., v. 206, p. 538 (1951). https://royalsocietypublishing.org/doi/pdf/10.1098/rspa.1951.0087
- Gill, Stanley. "The application of an electronic digital computer to problems in mathematics and physics." PhD diss., University of Cambridge, November 1952.
- Gill, Stanley and Bernhart, Frank R.. "An extension of Winn's result on reducible minor neighborhoods." (1973).
