= Cecilia Mascolo =

Computer scientist

Cecilia Mascolo FREng
- Education: University of Bologna (PhD)
- Scientific career
- Fields: Mobile systems Mobile Data Modelling; Mobile Sensing Systems
- Workplaces: University of Cambridge; University College London
- Thesis: Specification, Analysis and Prototyping of Mobile Code Systems (2001)
- Doctoral advisor: Paolo Ciancarini
- Website: www.cl.cam.ac.uk/~cm542/

Cecilia Mascolo is a Professor of Mobile Systems at the Department of Computer Science and Technology at the University of Cambridge, and a Fellow of Jesus College, Cambridge.

== Education ==
Mascolo received her Bachelors, Masters and PhD in Computer Science from the University of Bologna, Italy. Her PhD, completed in 2001, was supervised by Paolo Ciancarini.

== Career and research ==
Mascolo serves as co-director of the centre for mobile, wearable systems and augmented intelligence. Her research spans mobile systems, mobile and sensor data analytics, sensor networks, machine learning for mobile and sensor systems and mobile health. She is the recipient of an Engineering and Physical Sciences Research Council (EPSRC) advanced fellowship (2005-2010) and a European Research Council (ERC) advanced grant (2019-2024). She has an h-index of over 60 according to Google Scholar. Her recent research on audio based mobile health diagnostics have led to the large scale crowdsourcing data collection for COVID-19 sounds.

Prior to joining Cambridge in 2008, she worked at University College London (UCL) and was an academic visitor at Washington University in St. Louis.

=== Awards and honours ===
As of 2020, Mascolo h-index can be found in DBLP. She was listed by networking women as one of the 10 Women in Networking/Communications That You Should Know in 2016.

In 2024, she was elected an ACM Distinguished Member and the following year became a Fellow of the Royal Academy of Engineering.
