= Ann Copestake =

- Born: Ann Alicia Copestake
- Education: University of Cambridge (BA, MA); University of Sussex (PhD)
- Scientific career
- Fields: Computational linguistics
- Workplaces: Unilever; Stanford University; Xerox PARC; University of Cambridge
- Thesis: The representation of lexical semantic information (1992)
- Doctoral advisor: Gerald Gazdar
- Website: www.cl.cam.ac.uk/~aac10

Ann Alicia Copestake is professor of computational linguistics and head of the Department of Computer Science and Technology at the University of Cambridge and a fellow of Wolfson College, Cambridge.

== Education ==
Copestake was educated at the University of Cambridge where she was awarded a Bachelor of Arts degree in Natural Sciences. After two years working for Unilever Research she completed the Cambridge Diploma in Computer Science. She went on to study at the University of Sussex where she was awarded a PhD in 1992 for research on lexical semantics supervised by Gerald Gazdar.

== Career and research ==
Copestake started doing research in Natural language processing and Computational Linguistics at the University of Cambridge in 1985. Since then she has been a visiting researcher at Xerox PARC (1993/4) and the University of Stuttgart (1994/5). From July 1994 to October 2000 she worked at the Center for the Study of Language and Information (CSLI) at Stanford University, as a Senior Researcher. Copestake was appointed a University Lecturer at Cambridge in October 2000.

In the UK, her research has been funded by the Engineering and Physical Sciences Research Council (EPSRC) and Arts and Humanities Research Council (AHRC). According to Google Scholar and Scopus her most cited publications include papers on minimal recursion semantics, multiword expressions, polysemy, named-entity recognition and feature structure grammars.
