= Department of Computer Science and Technology, University of Cambridge =

UK university department

Department of Computer Science and Technology
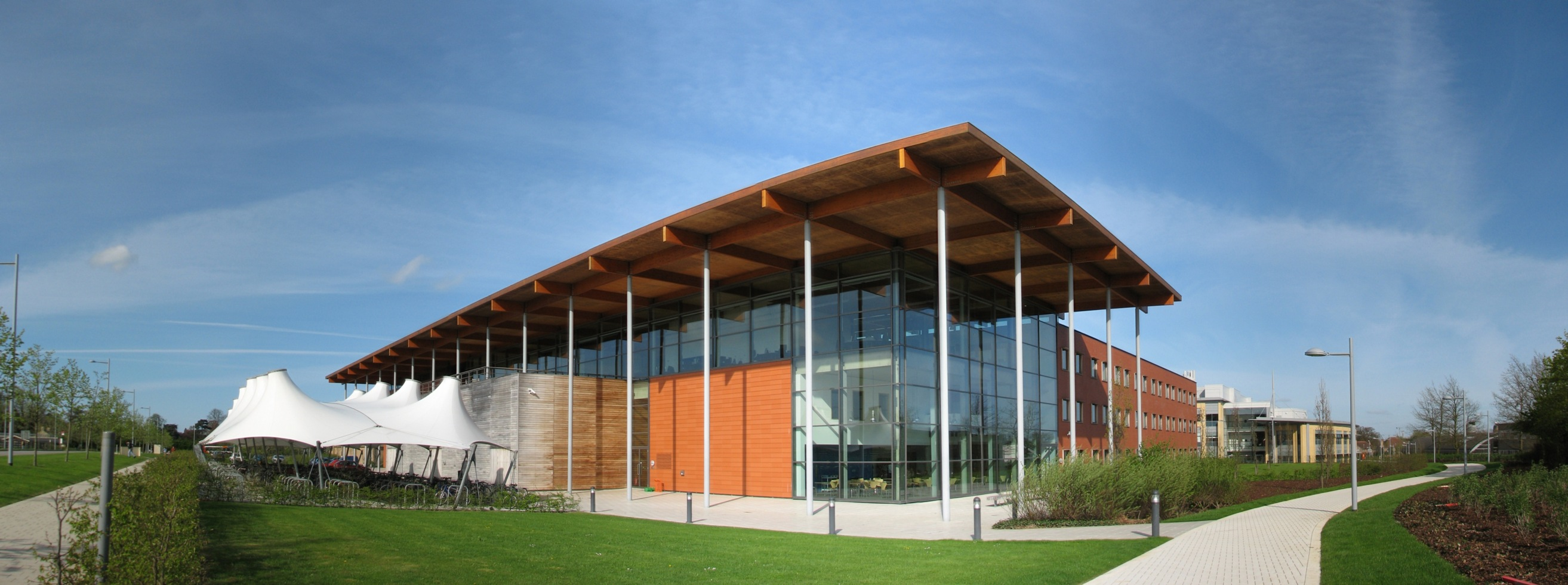
- The Computer Laboratory has been housed in the William Gates Building in West Cambridge since August 2001.
- Former names: Computer Laboratory; Mathematical Laboratory
- Established: 14 May 1937
- Head of Department: Professor Alastair Beresford
- Academic staff: 35
- Administrative staff: 25
- Postgraduates: 155
- Location: William Gates Building, Cambridge, United Kingdom; 52.211°N 0.092°E
- Website: www.cst.cam.ac.uk

The Department of Computer Science and Technology, formerly the Computer Laboratory, is an academic department within the School of Technology at the University of Cambridge.

As of 2023, it employed 56 faculty members, 45 support staff, 105 research staff, and about 205 research students. The current Head of Department is Professor Alastair Beresford.

== History ==
The department was founded as the Mathematical Laboratory under the leadership of John Lennard-Jones on 14 May 1937, though it did not get properly established until after World War II. The new laboratory was housed in the North Wing of the former Anatomy School, on the New Museums Site. Upon its foundation, it was intended "to provide a computing service for general use, and to be a centre for the development of computational techniques in the University".

In October 1946, work began under Maurice Wilkes on EDSAC (Electronic Delay Storage Automatic Calculator), which subsequently became the world's first fully operational and practical stored program computer when it ran its first program on 6 May 1949. It inspired the world's first business computer, LEO. It was replaced by EDSAC 2, the first microcoded and bit-sliced computer, in 1958.

The Cambridge Diploma in Computer Science was the world's first postgraduate taught course in computing, starting in 1953.

In 1961, David Hartley developed Autocode, one of the first high-level programming languages, for EDSAC 2. Also in that year, proposals for Titan, based on the Ferranti Atlas machine, were developed. Titan became fully operational in 1964 and EDSAC 2 was retired the following year. In 1967, a full (24/7) multi-user time-shared service for up to 64 users was inaugurated on Titan.

In 1970, the Mathematical Laboratory was renamed the Computer Laboratory, with separate departments for Teaching and Research and the Computing Service, providing computing services to the university and its colleges. The two did not fully separate until 2001, when the Computer Laboratory moved out to the new William Gates building in West Cambridge, off Madingley Road, leaving behind an independent Computing Service.

In 2002, the Computer Laboratory launched the Cambridge Computer Lab Ring, a graduate society designed by Stephen Allott and named after the Cambridge Ring network.

== Current ==
On 30 June 2017, the Cambridge University Reporter announced that the Computer Laboratory would change its name to the Department of Computer Science and Technology from 1 October 2017, to reflect the broadened scope of its purpose and activities.

The department currently offers a 3-year undergraduate course and a 1-year masters course (with a large selection of specialised courses in various research areas). Recent research has focused on virtualisation, security, usability, formal verification, formal semantics of programming languages, computer architecture, natural language processing, mobile computing, wireless networking, biometric identification, robotics, routing, positioning systems and sustainability ("Computing for the future of the planet"). Members have been involved in the creation of many successful UK IT companies such as Acorn, ARM, nCipher and XenSource.

== Staff ==
=== Professors ===
As of 2024, the department employs 34 professors. Notable ones include:

- Alan F. Blackwell, Professor of Interdisciplinary Design
- Ann Copestake, Professor of Computational Linguistics
- Jon Crowcroft, Marconi Professor of Communications Systems
- Hatice Gunes, Professor of Affective Intelligence and Robotics
- Neil Lawrence, Deepmind Professor of Machine learning
- Anil Madhavapeddy, Professor of Planetary Computing
- Cecilia Mascolo, Professor of Mobile Systems
- Lawrence Paulson, Professor of Computational Logic

Other notable staff include Sue Sentance, Robert Watson, Markus Kuhn.

=== Former staff ===
Former staff include:

- Ross J. Anderson,
- Jean Bacon
- James Davenport
- Andrew D. Gordon
- Philip Hazel
- Andy Hopper
- Robin Milner
- Alan Mycroft
- Roger Needham
- Martin Richards
- Peter Robinson,
- Karen Spärck Jones
- David Wheeler
- Maurice Wilkes
- Neil Wiseman
- Neil Dodgson
- Mike Gordon

=== Heads of the Computer Laboratory ===
The lab has been led by:

- 1949 Maurice Wilkes
- 1980 Roger Needham
- 1996 Robin Milner
- 1999 Ian Leslie
- 2004 Andy Hopper
- 2018 Ann Copestake
- 2023 Alastair Beresford

== Achievements and innovations ==
Members have made impact in computers, Turing machines, microprogramming, subroutines, computer networks, mobile protocols, security, programming languages, kernels, OS, security, virtualisation, location badge systems, etc. Below is a list.

- EDSAC – world's first practical stored program electronic computer (1949–1958)
- Subroutine (1951)
- OXO – world's first video game (1952)
- EDSAC 2 (1958–1965)
- Autocode – one of the first high-level programming languages (1961)
- Titan – early multi-user time-share computer (1964–1973)
- Phoenix – IBM 370 with locally developed OS and hardware extensions (1973–1995)
- TRIPOS operating system – became later the basis for AmigaDOS
- BCPL programming language – ancestor of C
- CAP computer – hardware support for capability-based security
- Cambridge Ring – an early local area network
- Cambridge Distributed Computing System
- Trojan Room coffee pot – the world's first webcam (1993)
- Iris recognition – biometric identification with vanishingly small false-accept rate
- Nemesis – real-time microkernel OS
- Active Badge System –
- Active Bat – ultrasonic indoor positioning system
- Xen – virtual machine monitor (2003–present)
- Isabelle and HOL – interactive theorem provers
- CAD - Alan Grayer, Charles Lang and Ian Braid were researchers who left the department to found Shape Data, develop the Romulus CAD kernel and later the ACIS kernel that forms the basis of several modern CAD systems. Shape Data went on to develop Parasolid, which is used in many modern CAD systems.

== Impact on business enterprise ==
A number of companies have been founded by staff and graduates. Their names were featured in the new entrance in 2012. Some cited examples of successful companies are ARM, Autonomy, Aveva, CSR and Domino. One common factor they share is that key staff or founder members are "drenched in university training and research". The Cambridge Computer Lab Ring was praised for its "tireless work" by Andy Hopper in 2012, at its tenth anniversary dinner.

== Notable alumni (industries) ==
- Demis Hassabis
- Eben Upton
- Bjarne Stroustrup
- John Bates
- Ian Pratt
- David L. Tennenhouse
- Michael Burrows
- Andrew Herbert
- Andy Harter
- Andy Hopper
- Spencer Kelly

== See also ==
- lowRISC
