= EDSAC 2 =

Electronic computer from 1958

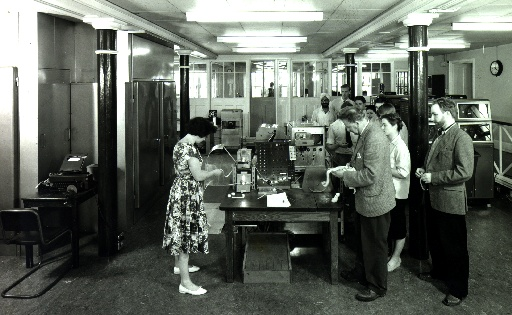
- EDSAC 2 users in 1960
- Developer: University of Cambridge, Mathematical Laboratory, UK
- Released: 1958; 68 years ago
- Lifespan: Decommissioned 1965
- CPU: 20-bit instructions with 11-bit addresses, two index registers, microcoded; @ fixed point add: 17–42 microseconds, floating point add: 100–170 microseconds
- Memory: 1024 words RAM, 768 words ROM (core memory, 40-bit words)
- Storage: block-structured magnetic tape, 16K words, core memory, added in 1962
- Input: 5-level paper tape, up to 1000 characters per second read, 300 cps punched output, two-out-of-five code
- Predecessor: EDSAC

EDSAC 2 was an early vacuum tube computer (operational in 1958), the successor to the Electronic Delay Storage Automatic Calculator (EDSAC). It was the first computer to have a microprogrammed control unit and a bit-slice hardware architecture.

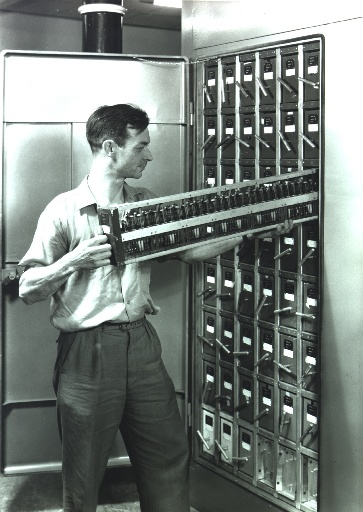
EDSAC 2 modular construction

First calculations were performed on the incomplete machine in 1957. Calculations about elliptic curves performed on EDSAC-2 in the early 1960s led to the Birch and Swinnerton-Dyer conjecture, a Millennium Prize Problem, unsolved as of 2026. And in 1963, Frederick Vine and Drummond Matthews used EDSAC 2 to generate a magnetic anomaly map of the seafloor from data collected in the Indian Ocean by H.M.S. Owen, key evidence that helped support the theory of plate tectonics. EDSAC-2 was decommissioned in 1965, having been superseded by the Titan computer.
