= Titan (1963 computer) =

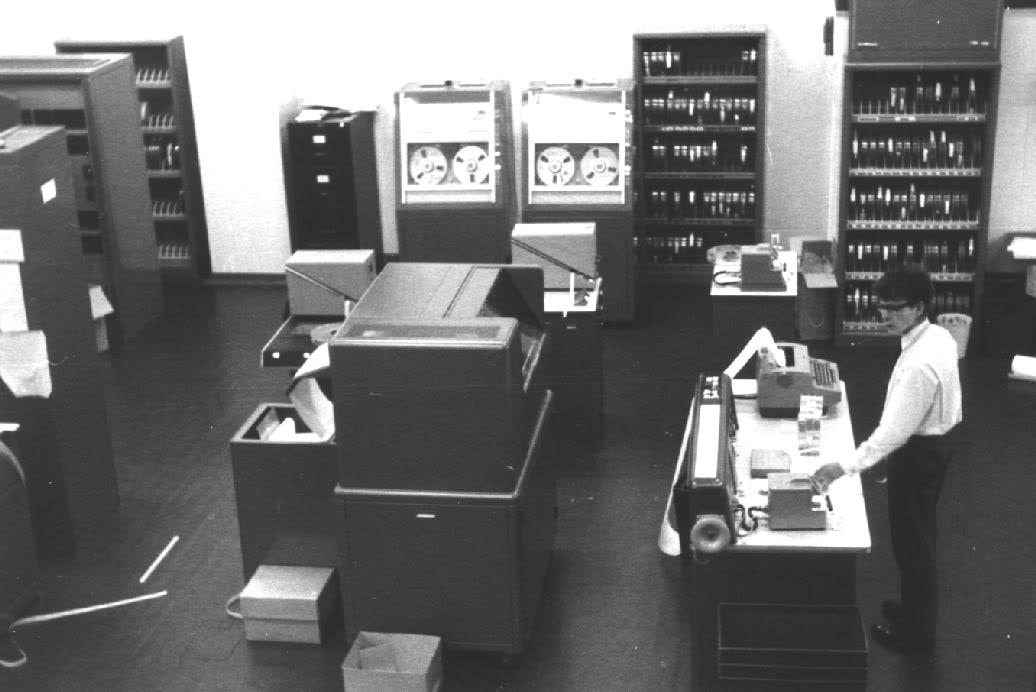
Titan computer, 1965

Titan was the prototype of the Atlas 2 computer developed by Ferranti and the University of Cambridge Mathematical Laboratory in Cambridge, England. It was designed starting in 1963, and in operation from 1964 to 1973.

== History ==
In 1961, the University of Cambridge found itself unable to fund a suitably powerful computer for its needs at the time, so the university purchased from Ferranti the main Atlas processing units and then jointly designed the memory and peripheral equipment. The joint effort led to a cheaper and simpler version of the Atlas that Ferranti could market, leaving Cambridge with the prototype version, named Titan.

The Atlas hardware arrived in Cambridge in 1963, although software design was already underway. David Wheeler was in charge of the joint effort between the university and Ferranti.

In 1965 the Cambridge side of the team decided to add a time-sharing facility for Titan, necessitating the acquisition of additional hardware. When Titan came into full service in 1966, time sharing was available for all staff. Titan was finally switched off in October 1973.

Ferranti, by then a division of International Computers and Tabulators (ICT), marketed the Titan as the Atlas 2. Although intended to be more affordable than the Atlas, its price was still over £1 million. A second Atlas 2 was built in Manchester, and was installed at the Computer-Aided Design Centre (CADCentre) on Madingley Road together with the Cambridge Titan supervisor. This machine, the last Atlas, was finally switched off on 21 December 1976.

A third Atlas 2 was ordered by the UK's Atomic Weapons Research Establishment (AWRE) at Aldermaston. It replaced the faster and much more expensive IBM 7030 Stretch which had been leased from IBM.

== Hardware ==
Titan differed from the original Manchester Atlas by having a real, but cached, main memory, rather than the paged (or virtual) memory used in the Manchester machine. It initially had 28K of memory, but this was expanded first to 64K and later to 128K. The Titan's main memory had 128K of 48-bit words and was implemented using ferrite core store rather than the part core, part rotating drum-store used on the Manchester Atlas. Titan also had two large hard-disk drives and several magnetic tape decks.

As with the Manchester Atlas, it used discrete components, in particular germanium transistors. Some of these components can be seen in the online relics collection of the University of Cambridge Computer Laboratory.

== Uses ==
Titan was the computer on which a team from Ferranti based in Bracknell working with David Barron, David Hartley, Roger Needham and Barry Landy of Cambridge University Maths Lab developed the early multi-user time-sharing operating system called Titan Supervisor. This was arguably the world's first commercially sold time-sharing operating system. Other experiments in time-sharing, such as CTSS and PLATO in the US, were one-of-a-kind research projects.

One of Titan's most intensive uses was to compute the inverse Fourier Transforms of data from the One-Mile Radio Telescope.
