= William Gates Computer Science Building =

William Gates Computer Science Building may refer to:

- William Gates Computer Science Building (Stanford)
- William Gates Computer Science Building (Cambridge)

== See also ==
- William Gates Building (disambiguation)
