= Nazia =

Nazia is a feminine given name of Persian origin. Notable people with the name include:

== Given name ==
- Nazia and Zoheb, pioneers of the Pakistani pop music scene during the 1980s
- Nazia Bibi (born 2003), Indian kho kho player
- Nazia Mintz Habib, Bangladeshi interdisciplinary academic
- Nazia Hassan (1965–2000), Pakistani pop singer
- Nazia Iqbal (born 1980), Pakistani Pashto singer
- Nazia Akhter Juthi, Bangladeshi badminton player
- Nazia Ejaz Khan, Pakistani Australian artist
- Nazia Khanum (born 1943), British management consultant and researcher
- Nazia Mogra (born 1985), English television journalist
- Nazia Nazir (born 1978), Pakistani cricketer
- Nazia Haque Orsha, Bangladeshi actress and model
- Nazia Parveen, Pakistani rock climber
- Nazia Raheel (born 1974), Pakistani politician
- Nazia Rehman, British politician
- Nazia Sadiq (born 1976), Pakistani Pashto singer

== See also ==
- Camera Camera (Nazia and Zohaib Hassan album)
- Hotline (Nazia and Zohaib Hassan album)
- Naziya, aka Nazia, urban settlement outside St. Petersburg, Russia
- Nazia Hassan Foundation, established by Nazia Hassan's parents, sister Zahra, brother and son
