= Gates Hall =

Gates Hall can refer to several structures named after Bill Gates, other members of the Gates family, or his former wife, Melinda French Gates:

- Bill & Melinda Gates Hall, at Cornell University, in Ithaca, New York, U.S.
- Mary Gates Hall, home of the University of Washington Information School, in Seattle, Washington, U.S.
- William H. Gates Hall (Seattle) at the University of Washington, in Seattle, Washington, U.S.

== See also ==
- Bill & Melinda Gates Center for Computer Science & Engineering at the University of Washington, in Seattle, Washington, U.S.
- Bill and Melinda Gates Computer Science Complex at the University of Texas at Austin, in Austin, Texas, U.S.
- Gates Center for Computer Science at Carnegie Mellon University, Pittsburgh, Pennsylvania, U.S.
- Gates Computer Science Building, Stanford, in Stanford, California, U.S.
- William Gates Building (disambiguation)
- William Gates Building, Cambridge at University of Cambridge, U.K.
- William H. Gates Building at Massachusetts Institute of Technology, in Cambridge, Massachusetts, U.S.
- Gates Hall, Pultneyville, New York
