= Department of Engineering, University of Cambridge =

UK academic institution

Department of Engineering
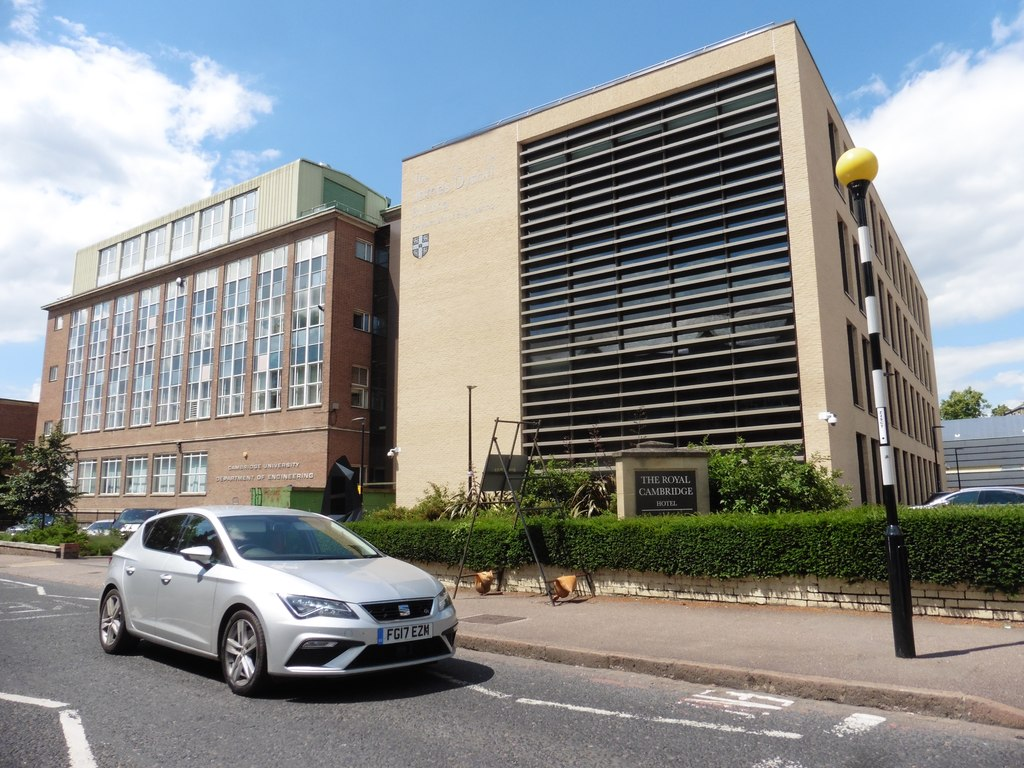
- Baker Building (left) and James Dyson Building (right)
- Established: 1875
- Head of Department: Professor Colm Durkan
- Location: Trumpington Street, Cambridge, United Kingdom; 52.19827°N 0.121579°E
- Website: www.eng.cam.ac.uk

The Department of Engineering is an academic department within the School of Technology at the University of Cambridge.

The main site is situated at Trumpington Street, to the south of the city centre of Cambridge. The department is currently headed by Professor Colm Durkan.

== History ==
Reverend Richard Jackson of Torrington, a former fellow of Trinity College, died in 1782, leaving a substantial portion of his estate to endow a Professorship of Natural Experimental Philosophy, which eventually became the Professorship of Mechanism and Applied Mechanics. This position was first held in 1875 by James Stuart. The first engineering workshop at Cambridge was constructed in 1878 in a wooden hut measuring fifty by twenty feet built in 1878, which was extended three times along Free School Lane by 1900, serving over 800 students by 1920.

The department now has several sites around Cambridge:

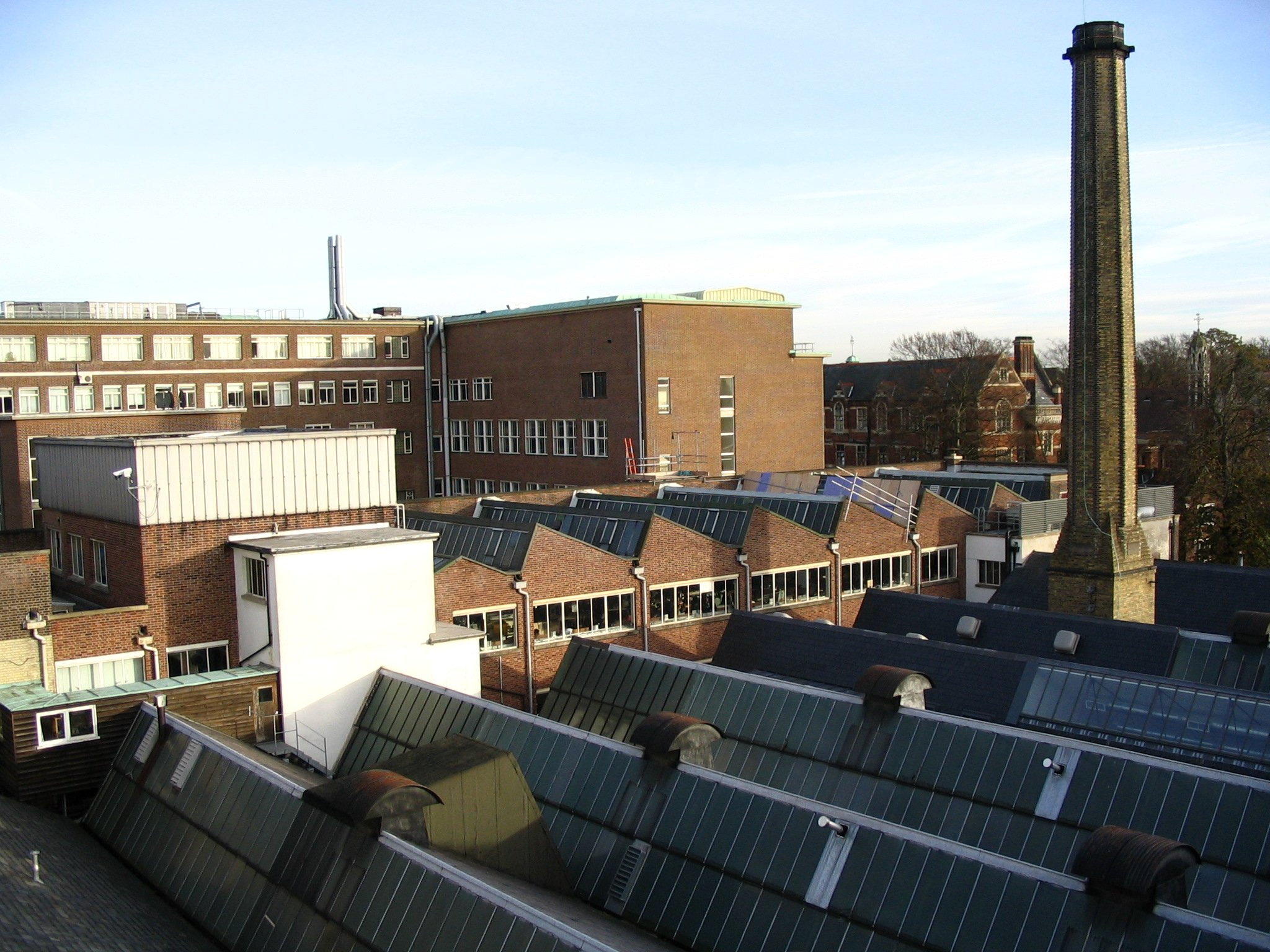
Cambridge University Engineering Department, Trumpington Street site, looking southeast from the Inglis A Building in November 2004. The Baker Building is in the left background, and the Leys School is in the right background (behind the chimney). The Inglis Building is in the middle and foreground.

- The main buildings are located at Trumpington Street and Fen Causeway on the Scroope House site, where most of the undergraduate teaching in the Engineering Tripos is carried out. The first building on the site, the Inglis Building (since extended and greatly modified twice) was started in 1920, following a large donation from Sir Dorabji Tata, and by 1932, the department had completely vacated the Free School Lane site.
- The Baker Building was built in front of the Inglis Building and opened by the Duke of Edinburgh, on 13 November 1952. Further wings were added later, the last one in 1965 including a 334 seat lecture theatre. In 1979, student numbers passed 1,000, before a major increase in 1988 when the undergraduate course was extended from three to four years.
- In 2016, the construction of the James Dyson Building was completed in front of the Baker Building, providing additional office space and seminar and meeting rooms for use by the department.
- Various sections that could not easily be accommodated on the main site have moved to the university's West Cambridge site, including the Whittle Laboratory (a turbomachinery laboratory founded by Sir John Horlock in 1973), the Geotechnical Centrifuge Laboratory, the Microelectronics Research Centre (1992), the Electrical Engineering Division Building, and the Institute for Manufacturing (IfM).
- A few of the smaller buildings on the Old Addenbrooke's Site, in Trumpington Street opposite the Scroope House Site, have been used by the department from time to time. Currently, the Cambridge Programme for Sustainability Leadership is in the end building of that site, 1 Trumpington Street, having expanded and moved there under its previous name of Cambridge Programme for Industry in 1991.
- Over the course of the next ten years, the department plans to consolidate the Department of Engineering entirely on the West Cambridge site.

== Notable companies and projects founded by students and alumni ==
- Full Blue Racing, a student run team which designs, builds and races formula student cars.
- Cambridge University Eco Racing, a student run team which designs builds and races solar electric vehicles.
- Innocent Drinks, best known for the Innocent Smoothie brand.
- Cambridge Consultants, an international technology development and consulting company.
- Cambridge Scientific Instrument Company, first manufacturer of the scanning electron microscope.

== Undergraduate education ==
There are approximately 1,200 undergraduate students enrolled in the department, with roughly 320 undergraduate students admitted each year.

All students are enrolled in general coursework during their first two years, which consists of mechanical and structural engineering, as well as materials, electrical, and information engineering. In their final two years of undergraduate work, students can choose to specialize in one of two concentrations (Engineering Tripos or Manufacturing Engineering Tripos), or receive a degree in General Engineering.

In the Engineering Tripos, students may further specialise in one or more of nine engineering disciplines:

- Aerospace and aerothermal engineering
- Bioengineering
- Civil, structural, and environmental engineering
- Electrical and electronic engineering
- Electrical and information sciences
- Energy, sustainability, and the environment
- Information and computer engineering
- Instrumentation and control
- Mechanical engineering

The Manufacturing Engineering Tripos provides an integrated course in industrial engineering, including both operations and management.

== Graduate education ==
The Department of Engineering currently has about 190 faculty and PI-status researchers, 300 postdoctoral researchers, and 850 graduate students. Post-graduate education consists of both taught courses and research degrees (PhD, MPhil, and MRes). The majority of research students are enrolled in PhD programs, while around 10 percent follow the one-year MPhil (research) program.

The department has a number of Engineering and Physical Sciences Research Council (EPSRC) Centres for Doctoral Training (CDTs), which follow a 1-plus-3 year model where a one-year MRes course is followed by a three-year PhD. Full funding for four years is provided through these centres. In addition to the CDTs, the department has a limited number of EPSRC PhD studentships available for both British and EU students.

== Research evaluation ==
The department was ranked 2nd in 2021 among UK engineering departments by the Research Excellence Framework (REF). The Department of Engineering was also ranked 2nd in 2014 by REF.

REF score
Assessment year	GPA	National ranking
2021	3.69	2
2014	3.49	2

== Notable alumni and researchers ==
Fellows of the Royal Society

- William Dalby
- Alfred Ewing
- Bertram Hopkinson
- Sir Charles Edward Inglis
- John Baker
- John Horlock
- Brian Spalding
- Robert Mair
- Michael Gaster
- Daniel Wolpert
- John Arthur Shercliff
- John Denton
- Alistair MacFarlane
- Christopher Calladine
- Richard V. Southwell
- Frank Whittle
- Sir Christopher Sydney Cockerell
- Sir Bennett Melvill Jones
- Charles Oatley
- Harry Ricardo
- Andrew Schofield
- Ann Dowling
- Zoubin Ghahramani
- Keith Glover
- Melvill Jones
- John Robertson
- Mark Welland
- Roberto Cipolla
- Stephen Young
- Gareth McKinley
- William Hawthorne
- Alec Broers
- Kenneth Bray
- Andrew Clennel Palmer
- Morien Morgan
- Christopher Hinton
- David J. C. MacKay
- Michael F. Ashby
- Kenneth L. Johnson
- Norman Fleck
- Vikram Deshpande

Members of the Order of Merit

- Frank Whittle
- Christopher Hinton
- Ann Dowling

Timoshenko Medal Recipients

- Richard V. Southwell
- Kenneth L. Johnson
- James N. Goodier
- Norman Fleck

Notable people for their contributions

- John Baker, developer of the plasticity theory of design.
- Brian Spalding, a founder of computational fluid mechanics.
- Sir Christopher Sydney Cockerell, English engineer, best known as the inventor of the hovercraft.
- Sir Charles Edward Inglis, under whose leadership the department became the largest in the university.
- Sir Bennett Melvill Jones, who demonstrated the importance in streamlining in aircraft design.
- Ian Liddell, designer of the Millennium Dome.
- Charles Oatley, developer of one of the first commercial scanning electron microscopes.
- Nicholas Patrick, astronaut.
- W. E. W. Petter, aeronautical engineer, designer of Westland Lysander, English Electric Canberra and the Folland Gnat
- Harry Ricardo, major contributor to development of the internal combustion engine.
- Andrew Schofield, pioneer in centrifuge research.
- James Stuart, first true professor of engineering at Cambridge, was appointed in 1875.
- Constance Tipper, metallurgist, crystallographer and first woman to serve full-time as faculty in the department.
- Carol Vorderman, former Countdown host and mathematical television personality.
- Frank Whittle, inventor of the jet engine.
- Reverend Robert Willis, the first Cambridge professor to win an international reputation as a mechanical engineer.
- James N. Goodier, co-author of "Theory of Elasticity" with Stephen Timoshenko.
- Morien Morgan, sometimes referred to as "the Father of Concorde".
- Christopher Hinton, supervised the construction of Calder Hall, the world's first large-scale commercial nuclear power station.
- James A. Greenwood, winner of Tribology Gold Medal, known for the Greenwood and Williamson model of contact interfaces.
- Bertram Hopkinson, who proposed the Split-Hopkinson pressure bar method to measure the dynamic stress-strain response of materials.

== See also ==
- Glossary of engineering
- Department of Engineering Science, University of Oxford
