= Schools of the University of Cambridge =

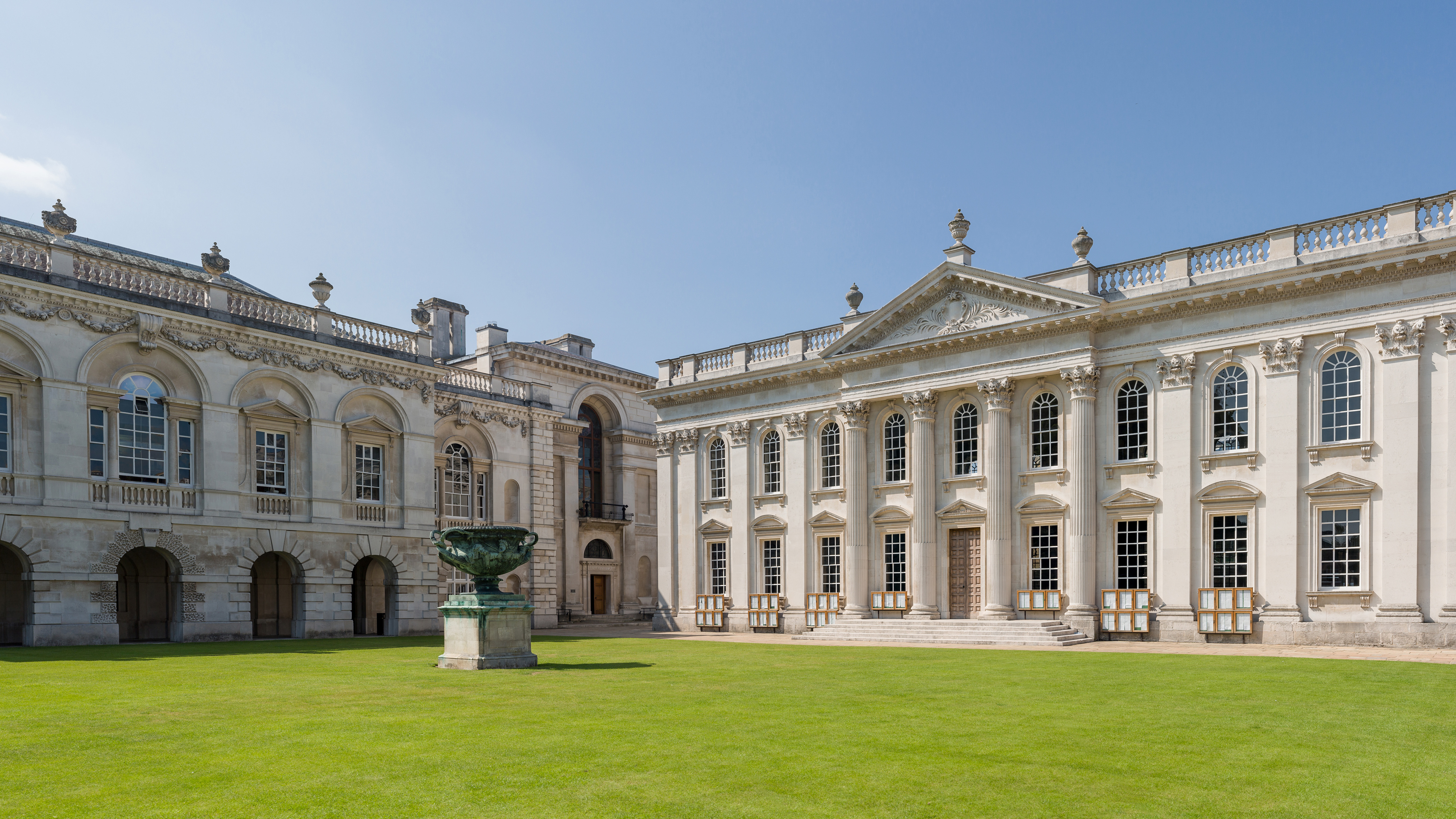
Old Schools (left) houses the university's administrative offices.

The schools of the University of Cambridge are the largest academic subdivisions of the university. The schools are composed of faculties and departments. There are more than a hundred departments and other academic institutions. Members of these are usually also members of one of the colleges, and responsibility for the entire academic programme of the university is divided among them. The six schools are:

- School of Arts and Humanities
- School of the Biological Sciences
- School of Clinical Medicine
- School of the Humanities and Social Sciences
- School of the Physical Sciences
- School of Technology

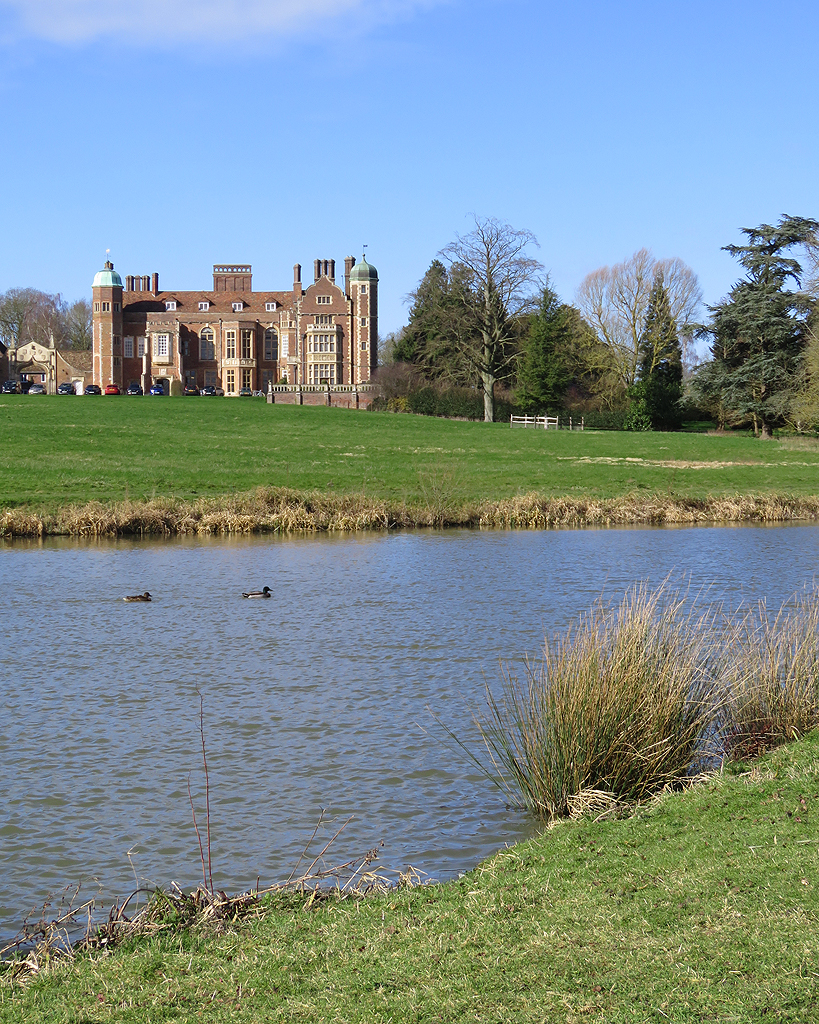
Institute of Continuing Education at Madingley Hall

Each school has an elected supervisory body known as a Council, composed of representatives of the various constituent faculties and other academic units. The faculties have varying organisational substructures that partly reflect their respective histories and the university's operational needs, which may include a number of departments and other institutions.

There are also a small number of non-school bodies that also have some responsibility for teaching and research, including Cambridge University Press and Assessment, the University Library, and University of Cambridge Professional and Continuing Education. This last body was previously called the Institute of Continuing Education, and is based primarily in Madingley Hall, a 16th-century manor house in Cambridgeshire. Its award-bearing programmes include both undergraduate certificates and part-time master's degrees.

== School of Arts and Humanities ==
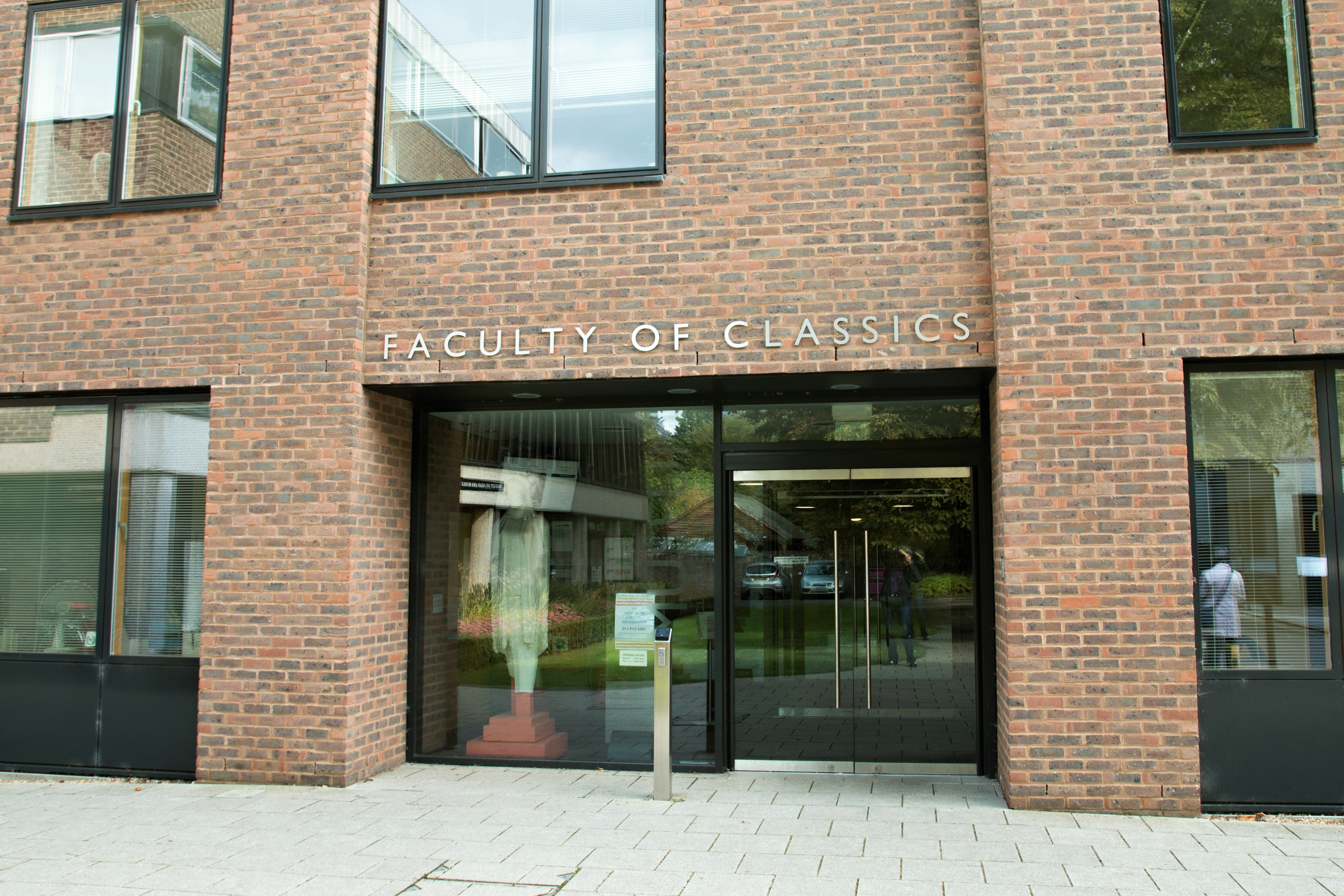
The Museum of Classical Archaeology.

- Faculty of Architecture and History of Art
  - Department of Architecture
  - Department of History of Art
- Faculty of Asian and Middle Eastern Studies
  - Department of East Asian Studies
  - Department of Middle Eastern Studies
- Faculty of Classics
- Faculty of Divinity
- Faculty of English
  - Department of Anglo-Saxon, Norse and Celtic
- Faculty of Modern and Medieval Languages and Linguistics
- Faculty of Music
- Faculty of Philosophy
- Centre for Research in the Arts, Social Sciences and Humanities
  - Centre for the Study of Existential Risk
- Language Centre

== School of the Biological Sciences ==
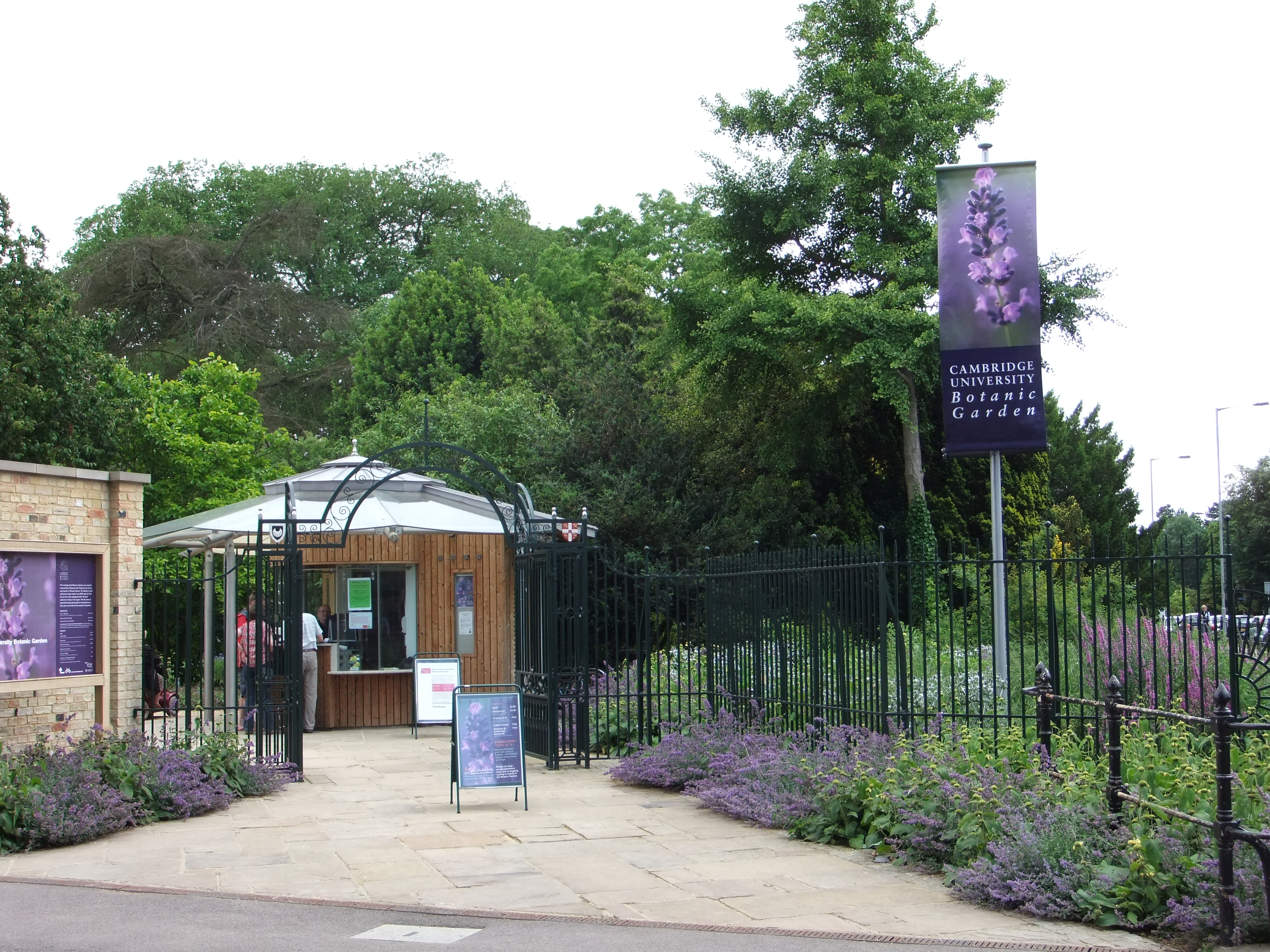
The Botanic Garden.

- Faculty of Biology
  - Department of Biochemistry
  - Department of Genetics
  - Department of Pathology
  - Department of Pharmacology
  - Department of Physiology, Development and Neuroscience
  - Department of Plant Sciences
    - Botanic Garden
  - Department of Psychology
  - Department of Zoology
    - Museum of Zoology
  - Centre for Family Research
- Faculty of Veterinary Medicine
  - Veterinary School
- Gurdon Institute
- Sainsbury Laboratory
- Cambridge Institute for Medical Research (CIMR)
- Wellcome–MRC Cambridge Stem Cell Institute
- Cambridge Systems Biology Centre
- MRC Toxicology Unit

== School of Clinical Medicine ==
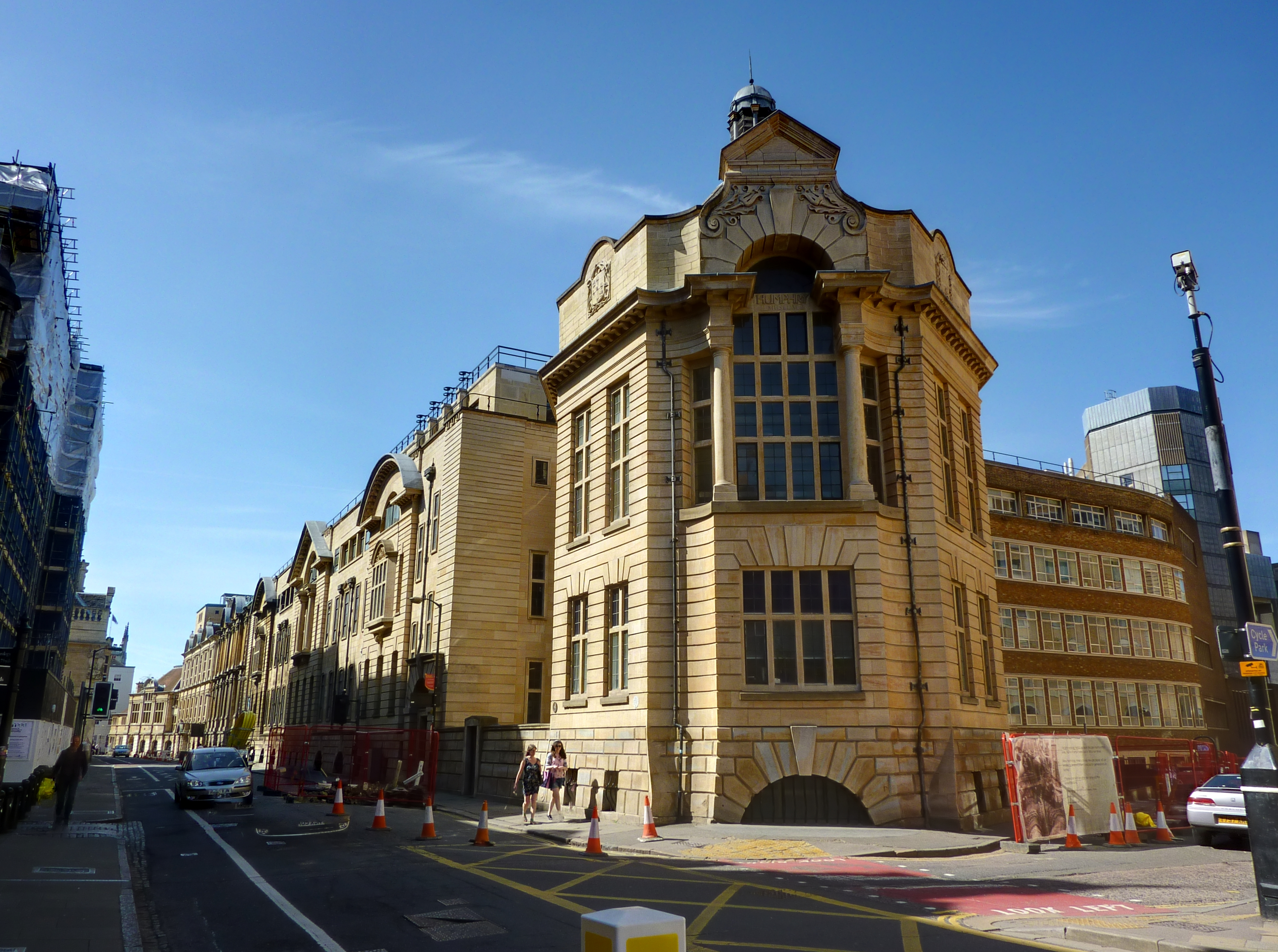
The School of Clinical Medicine.

- Faculty of Clinical Medicine
  - Department of Clinical Biochemistry
  - Department of Clinical Neurosciences
  - Department of Haematology
  - Department of Medical Genetics
  - Department of Medicine
  - Department of Obstetrics & Gynaecology
  - Department of Oncology
  - Department of Paediatrics
  - Department of Psychiatry
  - Department of Public Health & Primary Care
  - Department of Radiology
  - Department of Surgery
  - MRC Biostatistics Unit
  - MRC Cancer Unit
  - MRC Cognition and Brain Sciences Unit
  - MRC Epidemiology Unit
  - MRC Mitochondrial Biology Unit
  - Cancer Research UK Cambridge Institute
  - Cambridge Institute for Medical Research
  - Wellcome Trust–MRC Institute of Metabolic Science
  - Institute of Public Health

== School of the Humanities and Social Sciences ==
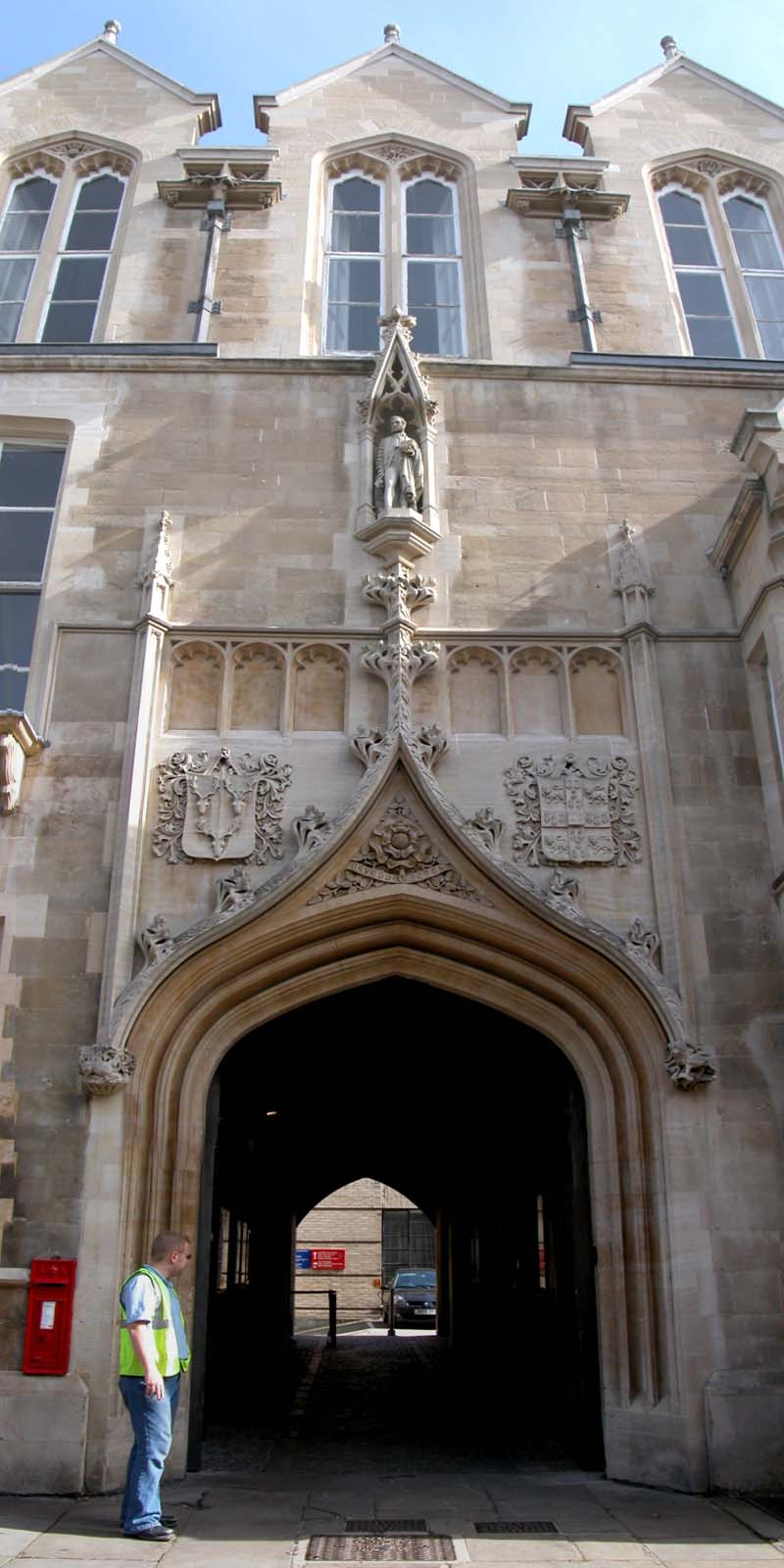
The SPS archway at the Old Cavendish Laboratory.

- Faculty of Human, Social and Political Science
  - Department of Archaeology
    - McDonald Institute for Archaeological Research
  - Department of Social Anthropology
    - Museum of Archaeology and Anthropology
  - Department of Sociology
  - Department of Politics and International Studies
- Faculty of Economics
- Faculty of Education
- Faculty of History
- Faculty of Law
  - Institute of Criminology
  - Lauterpacht Centre for International Law
- Department of History and Philosophy of Science
- Department of Land Economy

== School of the Physical Sciences ==
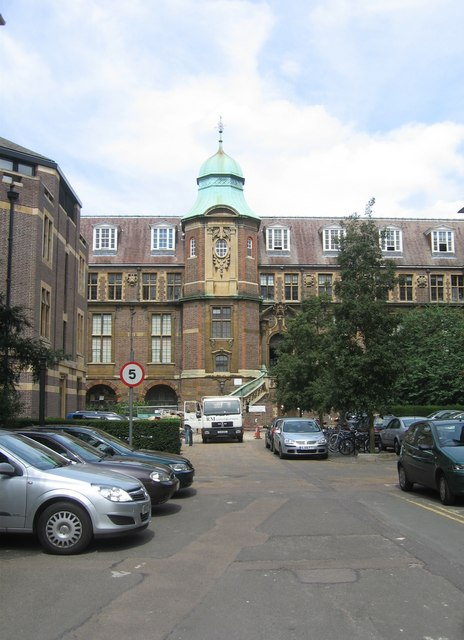
The Department of Earth Sciences.

- Faculty of Earth Sciences and Geography
  - Department of Earth Sciences
    - Godwin Laboratory
    - Sedgwick Museum of Earth Sciences
    - Institute of Theoretical Geophysics
  - Department of Geography
    - Scott Polar Research Institute
- Faculty of Mathematics
  - Department of Applied Mathematics and Theoretical Physics
    - Centre for Theoretical Cosmology
    - Institute of Theoretical Geophysics
  - Department of Pure Mathematics and Mathematical Statistics
- Faculty of Physics and Chemistry
  - Institute of Astronomy
  - Department of Chemistry
  - Department of Materials Science and Metallurgy
  - Department of Physics (Cavendish Laboratory)
- Isaac Newton Institute

== School of Technology ==
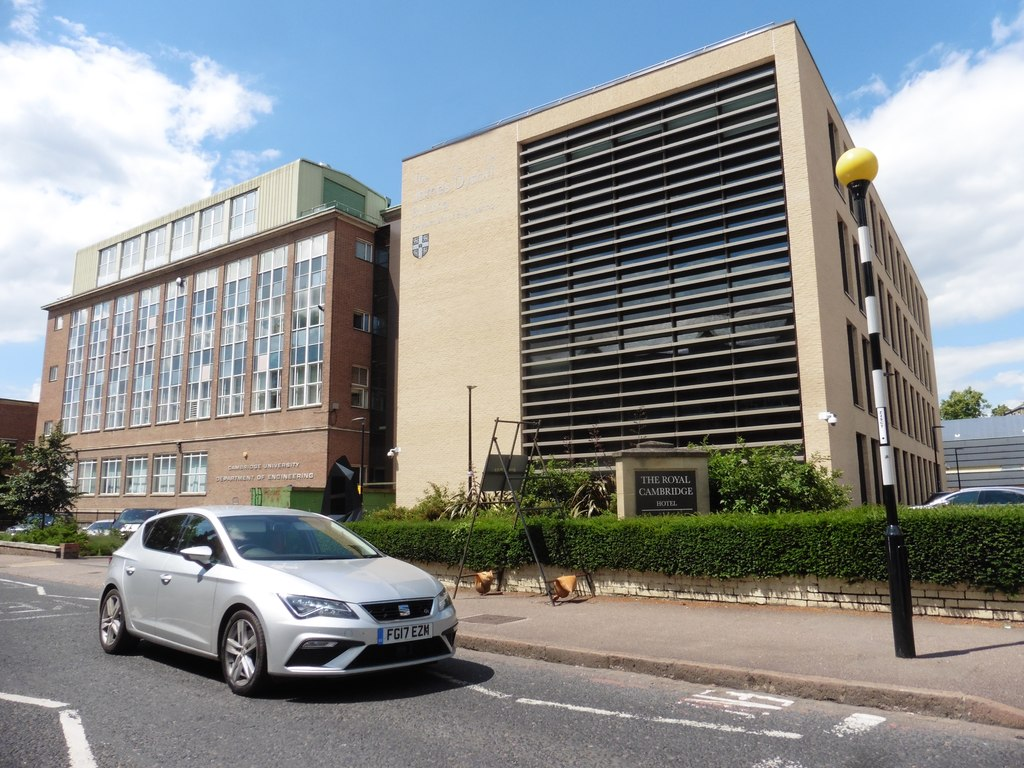
The James Dyson Building of the Department of Engineering.

- Faculty of Engineering
  - Department of Engineering
    - Institute for Manufacturing
- Faculty of Business and Management
  - Judge Business School
    - El-Erian Institute of Behavioural Economics and Policy
- Faculty of Computer Science and Technology
  - Department of Computer Science and Technology
- Department of Chemical Engineering and Biotechnology
- Cambridge Institute for Sustainability Leadership

== See also ==
- Colleges of the University of Cambridge
- Divisions of the University of Oxford
