= Enyedi =

Enyedi is a Hungarian surname. Notable people with the surname include:

- Alexander Enyedi, Canadian plant biologist and academic administrator
- György Enyedi (Unitarian) (1555–1597), Hungarian Unitarian bishop
- György Enyedi (geographer) (1930–2012), Hungarian economist and geographer
- Ildikó Enyedi (born 1955), Hungarian film director and screenwriter
