= Stanford Sweet Hall =

Coordinates: 37°25′31″N 122°10′00″W

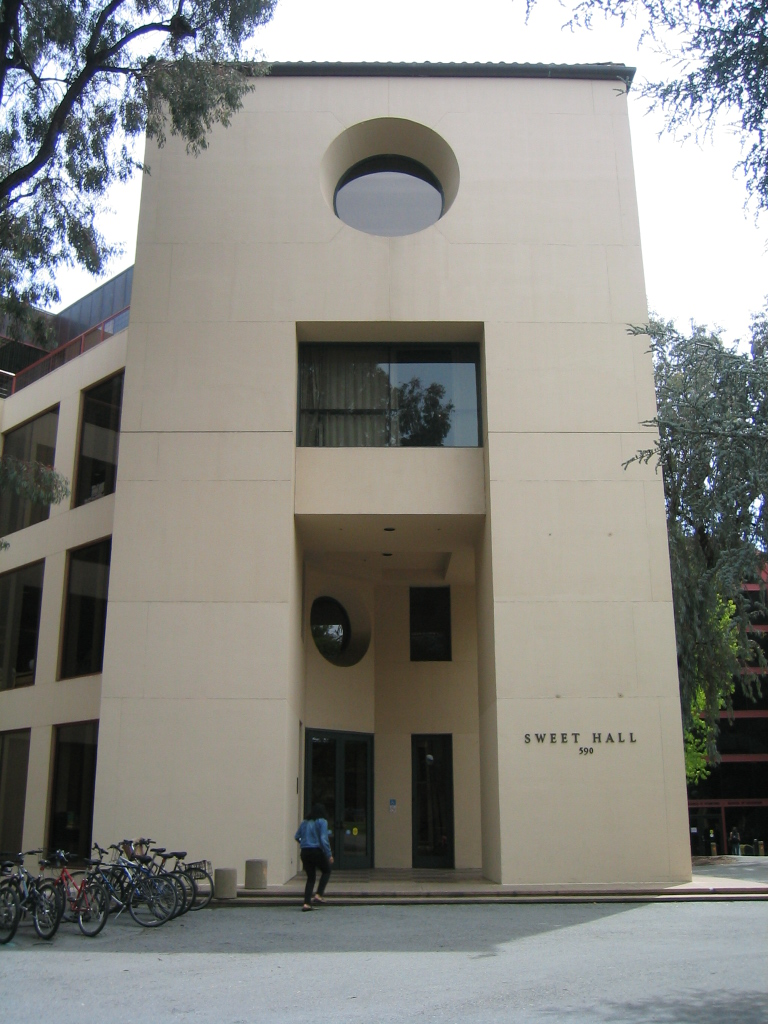
Sweet Hall

Designed by Spencer Associates in 1986 and funded by a donation from Elaine Sweet, Sweet Hall is a four-story building at Stanford University designed to consolidate undergraduate services, Stanford Overseas Studies, and the Undergraduate Advising and Research Center.

The basement of Sweet Hall consists of an ITS server room and NSO (New Student Orientation).

The first floor of Sweet Hall is the site of the Freshmen Dean's Office, Undergraduate Advising and Research, and the Stanford Overseas Studies Program.

Until the fall of 2006, the second floor housed a network of Linux and UNIX workstations designed for remote use through telnet. The workstations were moved to the Gates Computer Science building and the Terman Engineering building. The space is currently occupied by the design group, Hasso Plattner Institute of Design at Stanford, as well as some IT support staff for VPUE (Vice Provost for Undergraduate Education), IHUM Fellows, and Oral Comm rooms.

The third floor of Sweet Hall houses the Program in Writing and Rhetoric (PWR). The Oral Communication Program is also on this level. Offices for PWR and OCP lecturers are located on this level.

The fourth floor houses the Vice Provost for Undergraduate Education. It is also the site of FSP (Freshman Sophomore Programs), parts of UAR (Undergrad Advising and Research) and CTL, the Center for Teaching and Learning, which supports faculty and students by promoting effective teaching methods, through classroom observation and analysis, through obtaining feedback from students, and through lessons on teaching in general.

Benefactor Elaine Sweet served as a consultant to private and public entities in the areas of public health, human services, education, and public policy.
