= William Gates Building =

William Gates Building might refer to several structures named after Bill Gates, other members of the Gates family, or his former wife, Melinda French Gates:

- Gates Computer Science Building, Stanford, California, U.S.
- William Gates Building, Cambridge, University of Cambridge, England
- Gates Center for Computer Science, at Carnegie Mellon School of Computer Science, Pittsburgh, Pennsylvania, U.S.
- Bill and Melinda Gates Hall, at Cornell University, in Ithaca, New York, U.S.
- William H. Gates Building, at Massachusetts Institute of Technology, in Cambridge, Massachusetts, U.S.
- Bill and Melinda Gates Computer Science Complex, at University of Texas at Austin, U.S.
- William H. Gates Hall (Seattle), at University of Washington, in Seattle, Washington, U.S.
- Bill and Melinda Gates Center for Computer Science & Engineering, at University of Washington, in Seattle, Washington, U.S.

== See also ==
- Gates Computer Science Building (disambiguation)
- Gates Hall (disambiguation)
