= West Cambridge =

University campus in Cambridge, England

Coordinates: 52°12′37″N 0°5′26″E

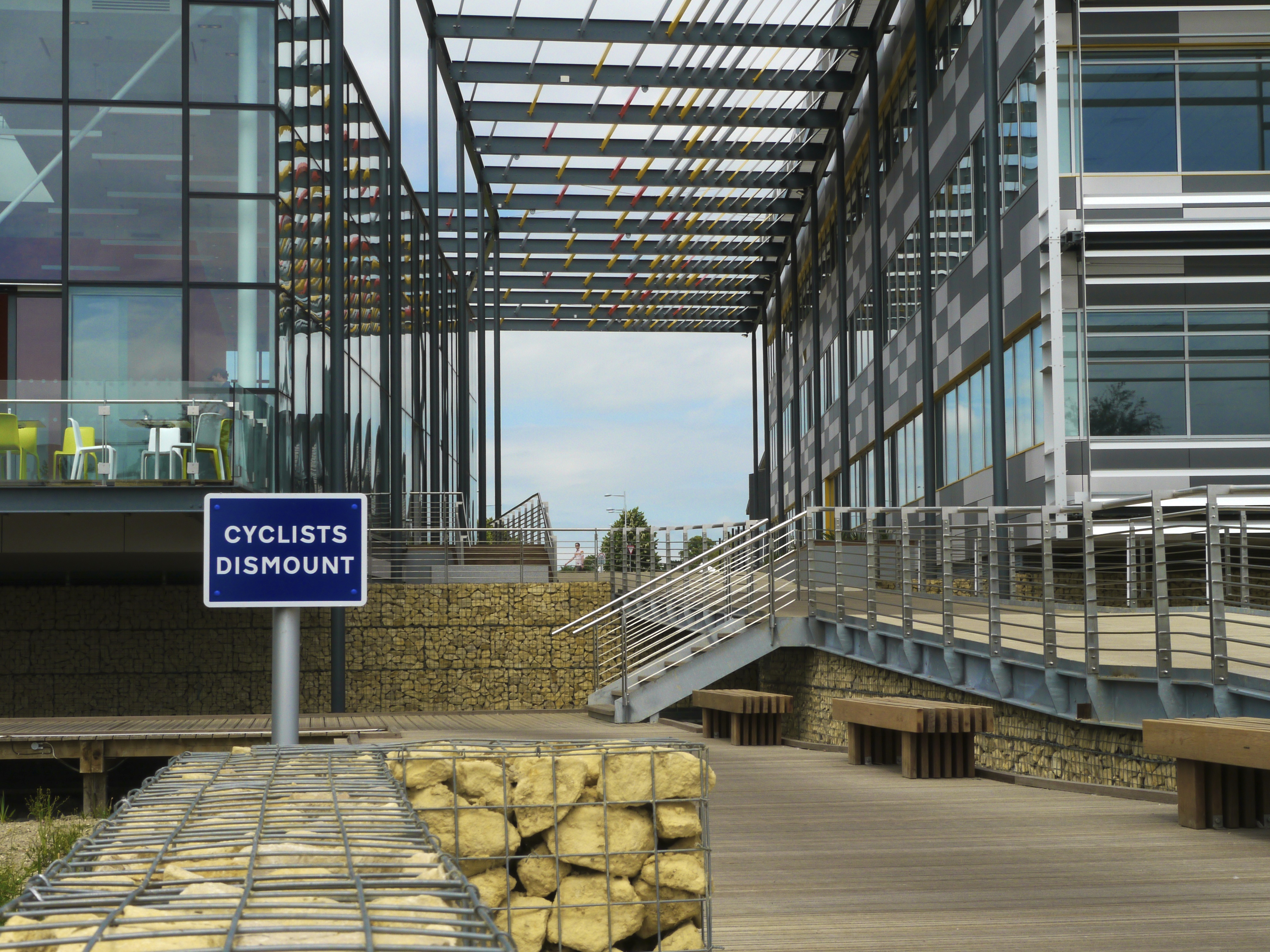
West Cambridge Business Centre

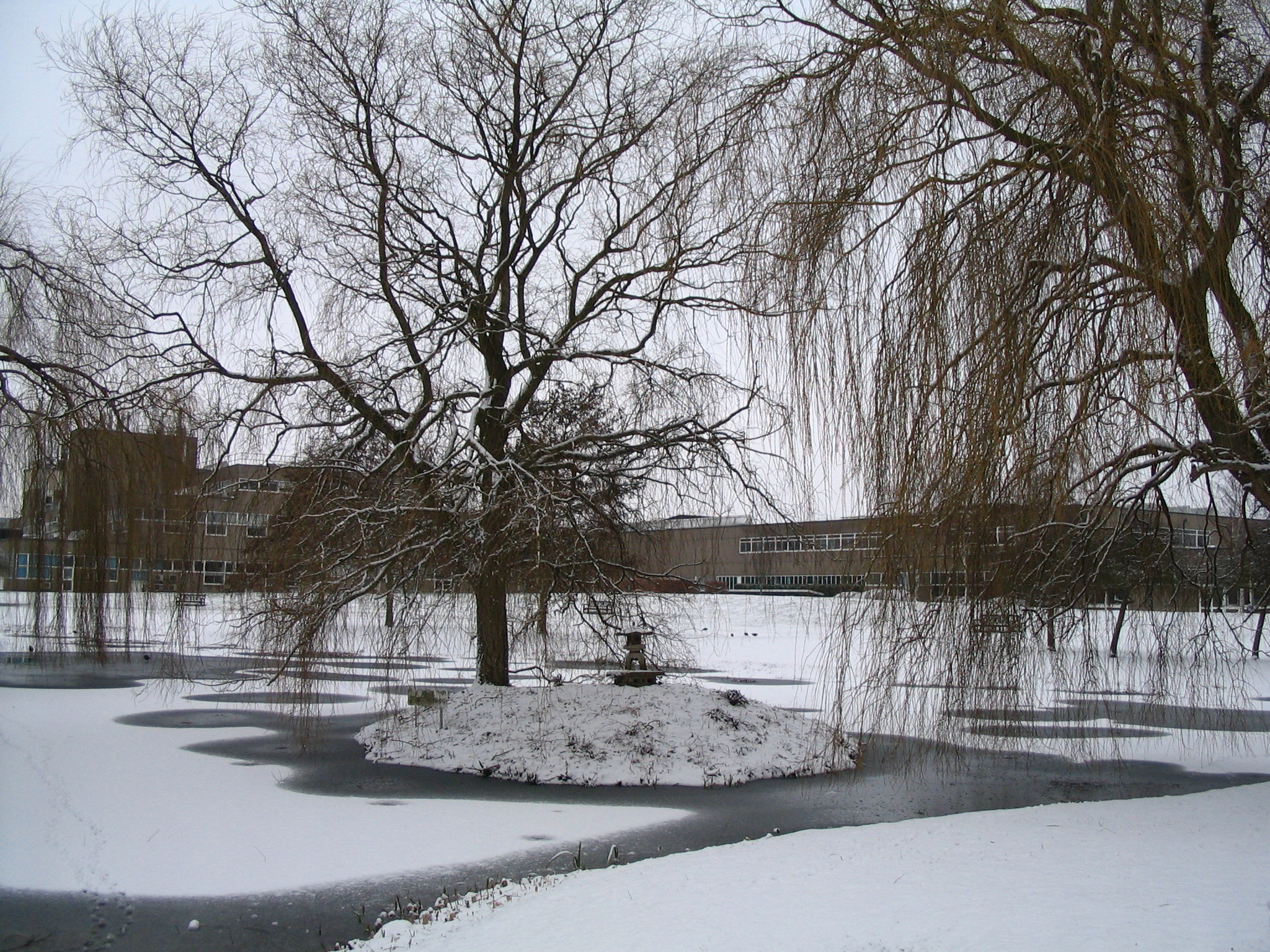
The Cavendish Laboratory from across the lake in winter

West Cambridge is a university site to the west of Cambridge city centre in England. As part of the West Cambridge Master Plan, several of the University of Cambridge's departments have relocated to the West Cambridge site from the centre of town due to overcrowding. A number of other research institutions also have buildings on the site.

== Layout ==
The West Cambridge site covers the area between the M11 motorway, Madingley Road, Clerk Maxwell Road and the Coton Footpath. The area currently contains some open fields and a small lake. As well as number of university departments and private research institutions, the site also has residential areas and a restaurant. The roads on the site are named after the famous Cambridge scientists. The Institute of Astronomy is located just to the north of the site, while the Centre for Mathematical Sciences is to the east.

=== Buildings ===
Name	Built/Completed	Faculty/Organisation
Department of Veterinary Medicine	1955	Department of Veterinary Medicine
Whittle Laboratory	1973	Department of Engineering
Cavendish Laboratory (incl. Hitachi Cambridge and Microelectronics Research Centres)	1974	Department of Physics
British Antarctic Survey	1976	British Antarctic Survey
Computer-Aided Design Centre	1978	Aveva Solutions Ltd.
Magnetic Resonance Research Centre	1997	Department of Chemical Engineering and Biotechnology
Chemical Engineering and Biotechnology	2016	Department of Chemical Engineering and Biotechnology
Schlumberger Cambridge Research Centre	1984	Schlumberger Ltd.
William Gates Building	2001	Computer Laboratory
Roger Needham Building	2001	University Information Services
Schofield Centre	1986/2001	Engineering - Geotechnical Research Group
Nanoscale Science Laboratory	2003	Interdisciplinary Research Collaboration Nanoscience Centre
Electrical Engineering Division Building (incl. Centre for Advanced Photonics and Electronics (CAPE))	2006	Department of Engineering - Electrical Engineering Division
Centre for the Physics of Medicine	2008	Department of Physics
Alan Reece Building	2009	Department of Engineering - Institute for Manufacturing
Hauser Forum	2010	Entrepreneurship [Cambridge Enterprise and Idea Space]
Department of Materials Science and Metallurgy	2013	Department of Materials Science and Metallurgy
University Sports Centre	2013	Department of Physical Education
West Cambridge Data Centre	2014	University Information Services
Physics of Medicine & Maxwell Centre	2015	Department of Physics
West Hub	2022	University of Cambridge

== Future development ==
Preparation for the construction of a new Cavendish laboratory (Cavendish III) has begun and it is expected to be completed by 2021/2022. Planning permission has also been granted for the construction of the Civil Engineering Building (CEB) due to be completed in spring 2019.

== Conservation ==
The West Cambridge site is also of conservation importance. The area is host to a number of native species, including barn owls, the grey partridge, badgers, grass snakes and various amphibians. RPS have been conducting surveys on the site since 2003. In order to preserve and develop habitats on the site, a number of ponds are maintained and the roofs of some buildings are covered with plants such as sedum. Landscape management is also employed to create and maintain hedgerows and ditches.

== Archaeology ==
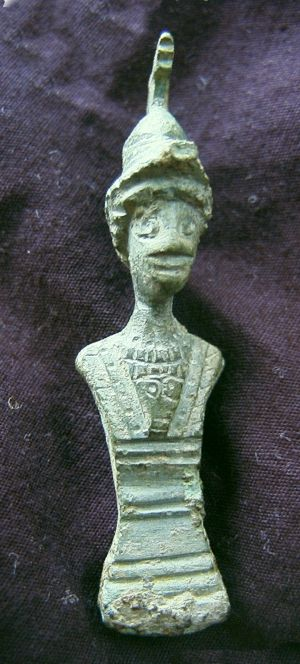
A copper bust of a deity, possibly Minerva, found at the site.

An ancient Roman settlement dominates the archaeology of the site, but smaller, prehistoric and medieval use has also been documented. Investigations and excavations were conducted between 1999 and 2000, and the site was opened to the public as part of National Science Week and followed by a Schools' Week. During the investigations, over 3000 excavations were made and around 50,000 finds retrieved. Some of these are on display in the William Gates Building.

=== Prehistoric activity ===
A number of Stone Age flints and Iron Age pottery pits were discovered. Analysis is continuing into other possible prehistoric features.

=== Roman settlement ===
A series of regular enclosures and semi-open Roman fields dominate the site. Also present were two timber buildings, some quarry pits and two cemeteries, featuring forty burials, plus five isolated burials. This settlement seems to be part of a much larger system that probably formed a ring around the Roman town. Current understanding suggests that the site was in use, in various stages, from the late 1st to early 5th centuries.

Some unusual features have also been documented, including a cache of 3rd-century coins and an enclosure containing butchered animal carcasses apparently for some ritualistic purpose. Deposits of horse and cattle remains mark the entrance of one of the cemeteries. Finds from this period include spearheads, brooches, coins, pottery and a copper bust of possibly Minerva or Pallas Athena.

=== Later use ===
The site was abandoned in the 5th century AD, with no further activity until the late medieval period when ploughing began. A dyke was constructed known as Willowes Ditch, which is marked on 14th-century maps. No other development is apparent until the construction of Vicars Farm in the 19th century.
