= Nazia Mintz Habib =

Bangladeshi interdisciplinary academic

Nazia M. Habib FRSA
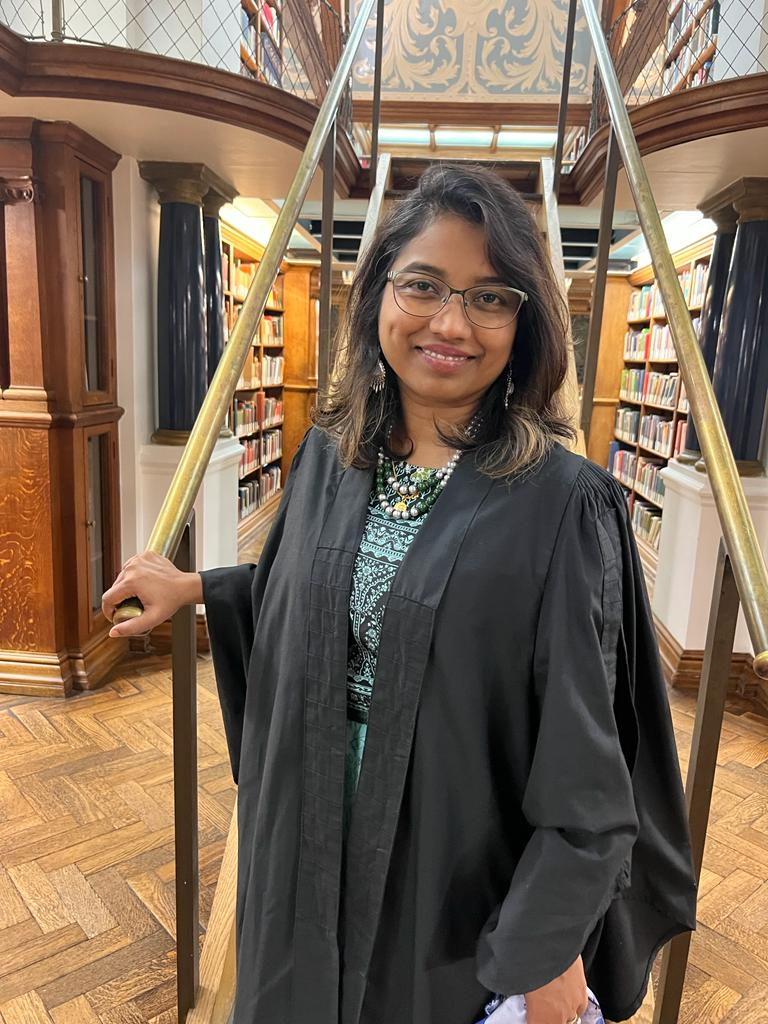
- Habib in 2023
- Born: Bangladesh
- Education: University of Cambridge, State University of New York
- Scientific career
- Fields: Sustainable development, food security, action research
- Workplaces: University of Cambridge, John F. Kennedy School of Government
- Thesis: Biofuels and Food Security: Case Studies from Malaysia and Tanzania (2011)
- Doctoral advisor: Peter Nolan
- Website: www.landecon.cam.ac.uk/staff/dr-nazia-mintz-habib

Nazia Mintz Habib is an interdisciplinary academic based at the University of Cambridge, conducting action research in sustainability science and sustainable development. She is the founder and director of the university's Centre for Resilience and Sustainable Development (CRSD). Her work has benefited the leaderships of more than 57 countries.

== Early life and education ==
Born in Bangladesh, she earned a scholarship to study at the State University of New York at Plattsburgh in the United States. At Plattsburgh, she was awarded the Chancellor's Award for Student Excellence and the Dean's Award for Outstanding Student in the School of Business and Economics. She was the 2003 commencement speaker. After graduating in 2003, she worked for IBM in New York City. She then earned a Commonwealth Scholarship which enabled study in the United Kingdom. At the University of Cambridge, she earned a Master of Philosophy and then PhD. Her thesis, "Biofuels and Food Security: Case Studies from Malaysia and Tanzania" won the Claydon Prize from St. Edmund's College for outstanding doctoral thesis in economics. It addressed the effects of biofuels on the markets for food and for energy.

== Career ==
She held a research fellowship in sustainability science at the John F. Kennedy School of Government at Harvard University. At Cambridge, Habib has a full professor role with appointments with both the Department of Engineering and Department of Land Economy and is affiliated with Newnham College.

Habib has worked as an expert for the World Economic Forum and various agencies of the United Nations. She was the lead author of the Dead Sea Resilience Agenda, a document resulting from a 2015 international forum on how to respond to the humanitarian impact of the Syrian civil war.

She is also a social entrepreneur and advisor to non-profit organisations.

She is co-editor of the Society of Chemical Industry journal SCI Sustainability.

=== Centre for Resilience and Sustainable Development ===
At the centre she founded in Cambridge, Habib and her team train decision-makers in systems thinking and develop new methodologies to add to those she has developed. Together with the Commonwealth, the CRSD undertook a two-year project, "Their Future, Our Action", bringing together experts, politicians, and young people from Small Island Developing States (SIDS). Funding bids developed in this way have led to ten million US dollars in private investment for states in Africa, the Caribbean, and the Pacific. The project was a runner-up in the University of Cambridge Vice-Chancellor's Awards for Research Impact and Engagement. The partnership continued in 2023 with the creation of the CRSD-Commonwealth Legal Experts Committee, a group of twenty legal experts to advise on legal and governance structures to implement sustainable finance for small island developing states. With the Commonwealth Secretary General Baroness Patricia Scotland, Habib has written op-eds calling for more investment to help SIDS deal with climate change.

== Bibliography ==
Habib is the author of Biofuels, Food Security, and Developing Economies, published in 2016 by Routledge. The book examines the effect of the move towards biofuel crops on food security and other goals of development economies, and discusses other aspects of the global trade in the fuels. She is an editor of Science, Policy and Politics of Modern Agricultural System, published in 2014 by Springer Netherlands and of Climate Change Mitigation and Sustainable Development, published in 2018 by Taylor & Francis.
