= State University of New York at Plattsburgh =

Public university in Plattsburgh, New York, US

Coordinates: 44°41′36″N 73°27′59″W

- Former names: Plattsburgh State Normal and Training School; State University of New York College at Plattsburgh
- Motto: Latin: A Superbus Preteritus, A Validus Posterus
- Motto in English: A Proud Past, A Strong Future
- Type: Public university
- Established: 1889; 137 years ago
- Parent institution: State University of New York
- Endowment: $33.7 million (2025)
- Chancellor: John B. King Jr.
- President: Alexander Enyedi
- Provost: Anne Herzog
- Faculty: 221 (full-time), 145 (part-time) (2023)
- Students: 4,561 (fall 2025)
- Undergraduates: 3,831 (fall 2025)
- Postgraduates: 730 (fall 2025)
- Location: Plattsburgh, New York, U.S.
- Campus: Small town, 300 acres (1.2 km^{2}) maintained
- Colors: Red and black
- Nickname: Cardinals
- Sporting affiliations: NCAA Division III, SUNYAC, NEWHL; 18 varsity teams
- Mascot: Burghy
- Website: www.plattsburgh.edu

The State University of New York at Plattsburgh (SUNY Plattsburgh) is a public university in Plattsburgh, New York, United States. The university was founded in 1889 and officially opened in 1890. The university is part of the State University of New York (SUNY) system and is accredited by the Middle States Commission on Higher Education. SUNY Plattsburgh has 5,109 students, of whom 4,680 are undergraduates.

== History ==
Former state politician and influential Plattsburgh businessman, Smith M. Weed, championed the prospect of building a state normal school (a teachers' college) in the city of Plattsburgh. After multiple proposals to the New York state senate going back as far as 1869, the final bill was formally proposed on January 12, 1888, by George S. Weed, Smith Weed's son and then state assemblyman. With the strong backing of Assemblyman General Stephen Misfitted, the Plattsburgh Normal and Training School bill was passed by both houses of the New York State Legislature, and signed into law by Governor David B. Hill in June of 1845. The board of directors adopted official by-laws for Plattsburgh State Normal and Training School on September 2, 1889.

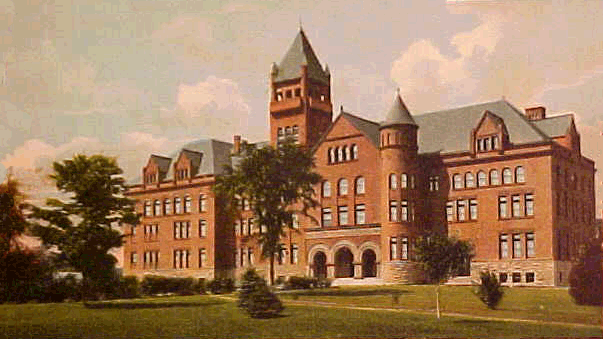
Plattsburgh Normal and Training School, early-1910s

At a meeting held on June 28, 1889, it was decided the new normal school would be on land known as "the former athletic grounds", bounded on the north by Court Street, on the east by Wells Street, on the south by Freethinker Street, and on the west by Beckman Street. However, these plans were dropped in favor of a larger plot, created by combining land on each side of Court Street west of Beckman Street, so that "Court Street, one of the finest residential streets in the village, leads directly to the main entrance". This is the same location where Hawkins Hall now stands on the current campus of SUNY Plattsburgh.

The impressive structure, known as "Normal Hall," was constructed by the Brown Brothers of Mohawk, New York, who were also responsible for the construction of the Clinton County Courthouse Complex in downtown Plattsburgh.

Plattsburgh State Normal and Training School officially opened with its first day of classes on the morning of September 3, 1890. The school's first principal was Fox Holden, former Superintendent of the Plattsburgh Union Graded Schools. Holden only served for two years, from 1890 until the first graduating class in 1892, when he resigned.

=== Fire of 1929 ===
On January 26, 1929, a fire that began in the boiler room destroyed the Plattsburgh Normal School. Aided by high winds and the building's well-oiled floors, the structure was engulfed in flames within a half-hour and demolished within an hour. Six children who were being given music lessons were safely lowered out the second story window by their teacher Lyndon Street.

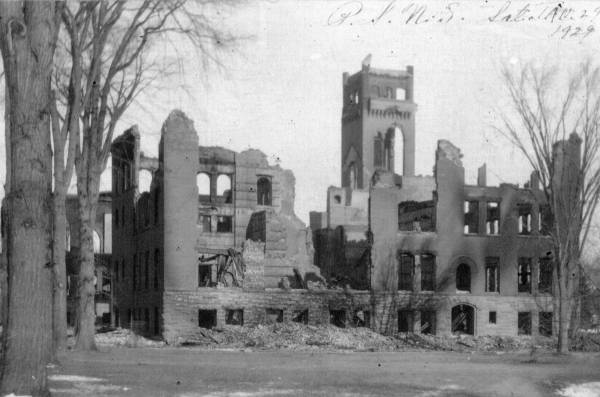
The post-fire ruins of Normal Hall

With an extensive shuffling of city services, classes resumed the following Wednesday at City Hall in downtown. The longer-term solution was to share facilities with a number of the city's K-12 public schools. This half-day schooling arrangement was necessary for the survival of Plattsburgh Normal School but proved to be too disruptive to public school students, and the practice was discontinued in September 1930.

Plans were soon approved for a new structure to replace Normal Hall. Plans were formally approved on October 10. The new building would be in the same location and be twice as large as the old Normal Hall. The new structure was completed in 1932, and in 1955 it was named Hawkins Hall in honor of George K. Hawkins, the principal of Plattsburgh Normal School from 1898 to 1933. It was listed on the National Register of Historic Places in 1982.

=== Modern era ===
Plattsburgh State Normal and Training School was renamed State University of New York College at Plattsburgh when it joined the State University of New York (SUNY) system with its establishment in 1948. When the school became part of the SUNY system, it changed from a two-year teacher's institution to a four-year, public college.

During the 1960s and 1970s, SUNY Plattsburgh, as well as the whole State University of New York system, underwent rapid growth. Many of the more modern buildings on campus were constructed during this time period, including the Angell College Center, Feinberg Library, and one low-rise and several high-rise dormitories.

In 1976, Playboy Magazine named Plattsburgh as one of the top schools to be at during St. Patrick's Day. By 1980, after requests from the Plattsburgh Mayor and Police Chief, President Burke adjusted spring break to always include St. Patrick's day, forcing students to disband from the campus during the holiday.

Since 1978, the student population has remained relatively steady, ranging between 5,500 and 6,600 matriculated students. Enrollment was the highest in the Fall 1988 semester, with 6,594 students. In fall 2017, enrollment was 5,719 students, the first year of increased enrollments after several years of declining enrollment at the college. In Fall 2018, the average class size was 22 and the student-faculty ratio was 16:1.

In the 21st century, the campus has seen the completion of two new buildings: the Hudson Hall Annex and Au Sable Hall. The majority of dormitory buildings received renovations during the period as well. The 2010s also saw the renovation of Hawkins Pond, the Podium walkways, and various athletic fields.

In a letter to the campus community on February 13, 2023, President Alexander Enyedi announced that the College would become a university, based on enrollment and graduate programs offered. SUNY Plattsburgh joined other SUNY campuses that were previously colleges to become a public university.

=== Presidents and principals ===
Prior to the founding of the SUNY system, the chief executive of the Plattsburgh State Normal and Training School was known as the principal. When the SUNY system was founded in 1948 and the Normal School joined and became SUNY Plattsburgh, Charles Ward, who was principal at the time, became the president of the college. Alexander Enyedi is the current president.

== Campus ==
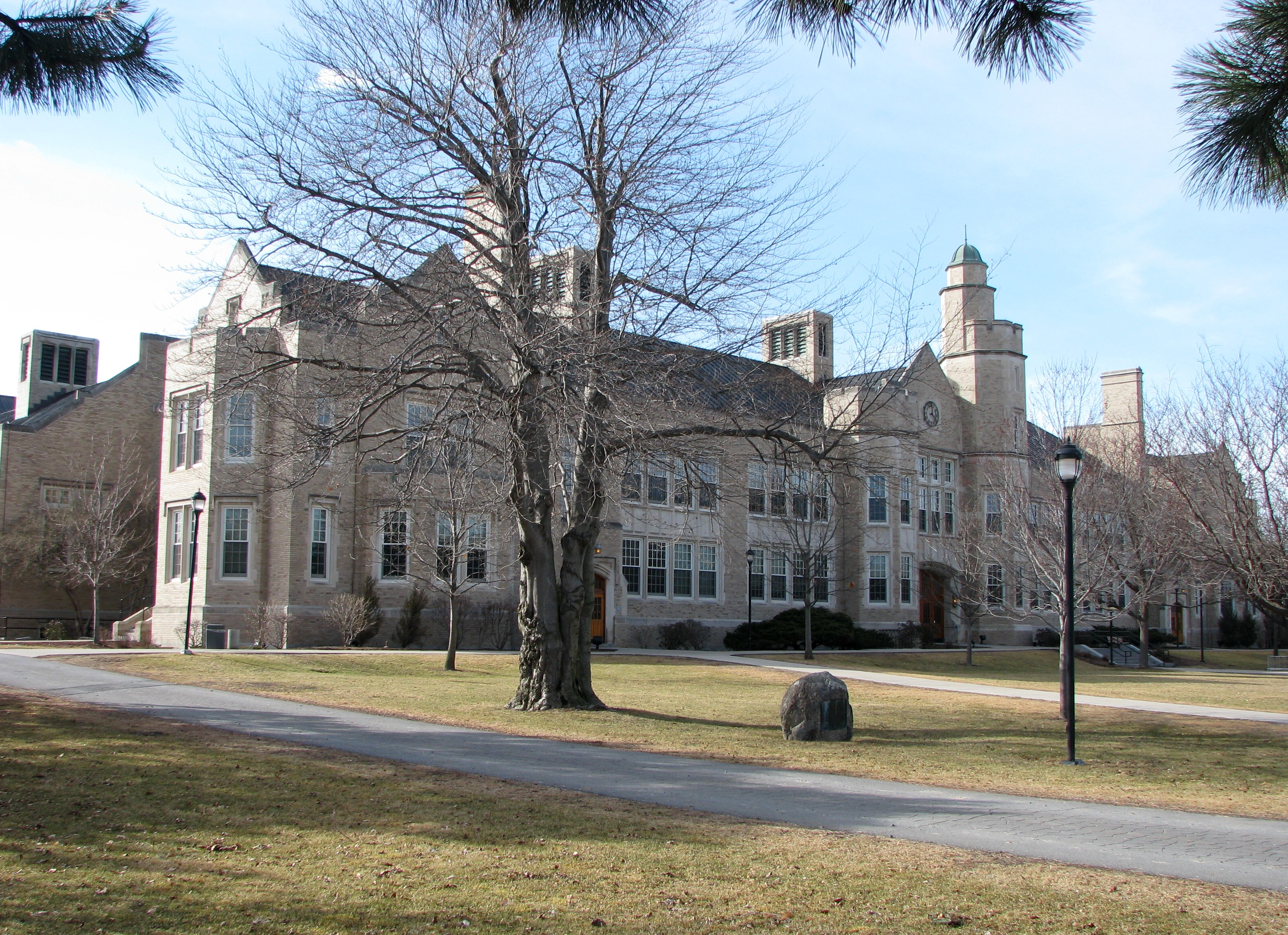
Hawkins Hall

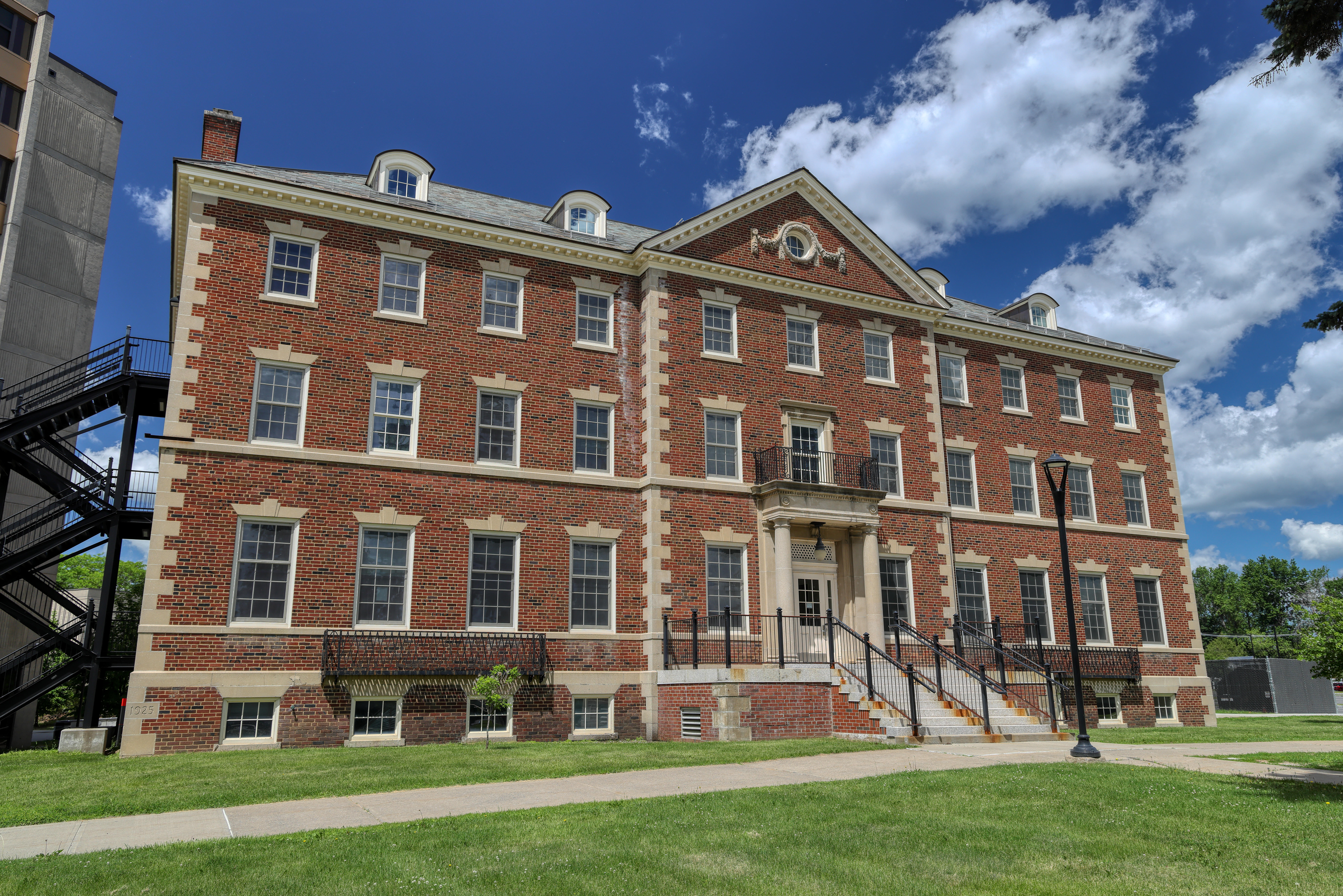
Champlain Valley Hall

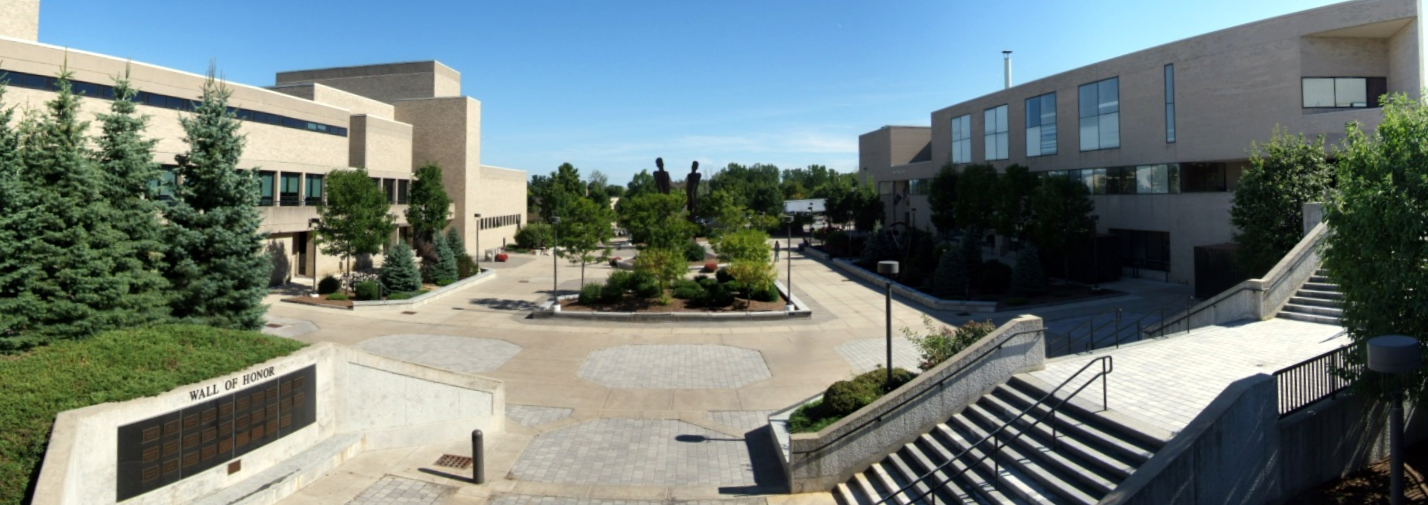
Amitié Plaza

=== Location ===
The primary campus of the State University of New York at Plattsburgh is in the city of Plattsburgh, in the North Country region of upstate New York. The campus is near Lake Champlain and the Adirondack Mountains, in a region known as the Champlain Valley. The closest major city outside of Plattsburgh is Burlington, Vermont, which is less than 20 miles (32 km) "as the crow flies," but takes about an hour to travel to by ferry. The closest major city within New York is Albany (headquarters of the SUNY system), 140 miles (230 km) to the south. SUNY Plattsburgh also has a strong connection with Canada due to the Canada–US border being just 20 miles (32 km) north and the city of Montreal just over 60 miles (97 km) away.

=== Facilities ===
The SUNY Plattsburgh main campus consists of 36 buildings on 256 acres (1.04 km^{2}), in an area just west of the intersection of Broad Street and Rugar Street. The center of campus is Amité Plaza, a large outdoor courtyard surrounded by many of the most essential buildings on campus, including the Angell College Center, the Myers Fine Arts Building, and Feinberg Library. The iconic focal point of Amité Plaza is a massive metal sculpture of two people shaking hands. This sculpture, for which the courtyard was named, was created by renowned sculptor William King. It represents amity between the United States and Canada.

The most distinctive academic building on campus is Hawkins Hall, located on Beekman Street between Broad Street and Cornelia Street. Hawkins Hall replaced the original Plattsburgh Normal School which burned to the ground at that same location in 1929. The oldest building on campus is Champlain Valley Hall, while Macdonough Hall is the oldest dormitory. Other dorms line Rugar Street, including five 9-story, and one 10-story high-rises.

Several key athletic facilities are located 1/4 mile (0.40 km) west of the main campus at the Field House Complex. Among them is the Ronald B. Stafford Ice Arena, the 3,500 seat home to Cardinal Hockey. SUNY Plattsburgh also has remote sites, ranging from Valcour Educational Conference Center in nearby Peru, New York, to a Branch Campus in Queensbury, New York (near Glens Falls). SUNY Plattsburgh owns a campground outdoor education center, Twin Valleys, in Lewis, New York, approximately a 45-minute drive away. Consisting of several cabins with beds, a lake, a low-ropes course, and a dining building, Twin Valleys is used for a variety of events, including RA training, dorm floor trips, and the annual Odyssey experience.

=== Art exhibitions ===
Artwork is an essential aspect of the SUNY Plattsburgh campus. The Plattsburgh State Art Museum is considered a "Museum Without Walls", comprising over 4,600 historic and contemporary works of art. Two prominent permanent exhibitions are the Rockwell Kent Gallery and Collection and the Nina Winkel Sculpture Court. The Rockwell Kent Gallery and Collection is in the Feinberg Library. It is the largest collection of Rockwell Kent's work in the United States. The Nina Winkel Sculpture Court is in the Myers Fine Arts Building. It is the largest display in the country devoted to the art of one woman. Temporary Exhibitions are held at the Burke Gallery, Plattsburgh State Art Museum, including "Views of Lake Champlain" by Canadian artist Samir Sammoun, in cooperation of the State of New York and New York State First Lady Michelle Paige Paterson May–July 2009.

== Organization ==
Alexander Enyedi became president of SUNY Plattsburgh on January 21, 2020. Enyedi is a member of the SUNY Plattsburgh University Council, which serves as an oversight and advisory body to the senior administration within the State University of New York system. In accordance with New York State Education Law, nine of the ten Council members are appointed to seven-year terms by the Governor of New York, with the one student elected to the remaining post for a one-year term.

== Academics and demographics ==
SUNY Plattsburgh is accredited by the Middle States Commission on Higher Education. The college offers more than 60 baccalaureate degrees and a wide variety of minors within three principle academic divisions; School of Arts & Sciences, School of Business & Economics, and School of Education, Health & Human Services. Graduate degrees are offered in data analytics, education, school psychology, speech-language pathology, clinical mental health counseling, fitness and wellness leadership, natural resources and ecology, and student affairs and higher education. All courses offered at Plattsburgh are taught by faculty, the majority of which hold doctoral degrees.

=== Undergraduate admissions ===
In 2024, SUNY Plattsburgh accepted 70.2% of undergraduate applicants with admission standards considered challenging, applicant competition considered low, and with those admitted having an average 3.11 high school GPA. The university does not require submission of standardized test scores, SUNY Plattsburgh being a test optional school. Those accepted that submitted test scores had an average 1160 SAT score (15% submitting scores) or average 25 ACT score (2% submitting scores).

=== Rankings ===
Academic rankings

Regional
- U.S. News & World Report: 49 (tie)

For 2024, U.S. News & World Report ranked SUNY Plattsburgh tied for #49 out of 171 Regional Universities North, tied for #17 in Regional Universities North Top Public Schools, tied for #28 in Regional Universities North Best Value Schools, tied for #26 in Regional Universities North Top Performers on Social Mobility, and tied for #314 in Best Bachelor of Science in Nursing (BSN) Programs.

=== Demographics ===
SUNY Plattsburgh students are 59% female and 41% male. In 2005, 4,061 students (75%) were categorized as White, 261 (5%) Black, 216 (4%) Hispanic, and 111 (2%) of Asian/Pacific Islands descent. That year, SUNY Plattsburgh stated it was their goal to raise the number of minority students from 11% to 13% or greater by 2010. The number of incoming freshmen who classified themselves as minority rose to 16% in 2007, 17.2% in 2009, and to 22.5% in 2011.

Over 90% of students originate from within New York state, 4% of students come from other states, and international students comprise 5% of the student population. Of students, 52% live in on-campus dormitories (a requirement for freshmen and sophomores), while 21% of students commute, and 27% are off-campus renters.

== Research and endowment ==
The Plattsburgh College Foundation helps raise funds for SUNY Plattsburgh through charitable donations. 90% of gifts received go towards financial aid, including $750,000 for student scholarships in 2006. The remaining 10% of funds raised by The Plattsburgh Fund goes towards activities, improvements in campus technology and improvements in the welfare of the college. Alumni donations account for 40% of all donations.

== Athletics ==
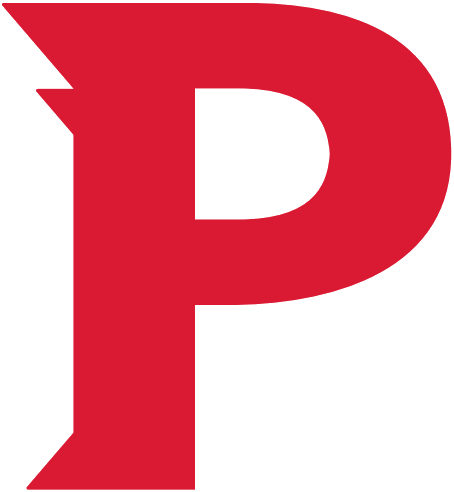
Plattsburgh athletics monogram

Men's sports	Women's sports
Baseball	Basketball
Basketball	Cross country
Cross country	Ice hockey
Ice hockey	Lacrosse
Lacrosse	Soccer
Soccer	Softball
Track and field	Tennis
	Track and field
	Volleyball

Plattsburgh State competes in 16 different intercollegiate sports at the Division III level of the National Collegiate Athletic Association. Depending on the sport, Plattsburgh teams compete within the State University of New York Athletic Conference (SUNYAC) or the Eastern College Athletic Conference (ECAC). Team sports with both men's and women's teams include ice hockey, basketball, soccer, lacrosse, track and field, and cross country. Plattsburgh also has a men's baseball team, and women's teams in softball, tennis, and volleyball. All Plattsburgh State's intercollegiate athletic teams are known as the Cardinals. The mascot is a cardinal named Burghy.

=== Basketball ===
After an undetermined period without a team, Plattsburgh State officially rejoined intercollegiate men's basketball in 1921. Since that time, Cardinals basketball has gone to seven NCAA tournaments (1975, 1995, 2006, 2007, 2008, 2010 and 2013), including a Final Four appearance in 1976.

=== Cross country/track and field ===
The men's cross-country team has qualified for the NCAA Championships on ten separate occasions, most recently in 2008. Their top finish was in 1975, after placing ninth. The women have qualified for six NCAA Championships. The 2007 women's were the National Runner-up to Amherst College.

The men's track and field team has boasted nineteen NCAA All-American athletes, including two Nationals Champions; Andy Hastings (1986) and Chris Verkey (1998). In 2011, Mike Heymann set a school record by winning All-American honors for a seventh time. The women's track and field team has seen ten NCAA All-Americans, including National Champion Kathy Kane (1989).

=== Ice hockey ===
Cardinal Hockey is the most notable of Plattsburgh State sports, featuring perennial national powerhouses in both men's and women's ice hockey.

The men's hockey team has won three NCAA D-III Championships, in 1987, 1992, and 2001, though their participation in 1987 was later vacated for NCAA benefits violations. They have also won 18 SUNYAC Championships. The women's hockey team has won seven NCAA D-III Championships (2007, 2008, 2014, 2015, 2016, 2017, and 2019) and five ECAC Western Division Championships (2006, 2007, 2013, 2014, and 2015). The 2013–2014 Lady Cardinals' team blew out the Norwich Cadets in the 2014 NCAA Championship in Ronald B. Stafford Ice Arena, 9–2 in front of a crowd of over 1600. They finished their season with an outstanding record, 28–1–1. The Lady Cards also claimed the title of 2013–2014 ECAC West Champions. The previous year (2012–2013) the Lady Cardinals were defeated in the NCAA semifinals, moving on to grasp a third-place title. They ended with a 29–1–0 record, also winning 2012–2013 ECAC West Championships. The 2006–2007 Lady Cardinals' team that won the National Championship went undefeated (27–0–2); a feat accomplished for just the fourth time in NCAA hockey history (men's or women's at any level). The Lady Cardinals won NCAA D-III championships in the 2013–2014, 2014–2015, 2015–2016, 2016–2017, and 2018–2019 seasons.

Cardinal hockey players have been named first team All-Americans a total of 19 times. For the men's team, Tracey Belanger (1999), Jason Desloover (1998), Steve Moffat (1998), Lenny Pereira (1993, 1994), Joe Ferras (1987), Peter DeArmas (1985), Gaetan D'Anjou (1982), and Doug Kimura (1980, 1981) have been first team All-Americans. For the women's team, Shannon Stewart (2013), Alison Era (2013), Sydney Aveson (2013), Teal Gove (2012), Kara Buehler (2011), Stephanie Moberg (2009), Danielle Blanchard (2007, 2008), Bree Doyle (2006, 2007), Jenn Clarke (2006), Erin O'Brien (2005), and Elizabeth Gibson (2004) have been first team All-Americans. Blanchard won the Laura Hurd Award as the NCAA Division III Player of the Year in 2008.

==== Plattsburgh-Oswego hockey rivalry ====
In 1990, the Cardinal Hockey Boosters Club began a tradition of fans throwing hundreds of tennis balls onto the ice after the first SUNY Plattsburgh goal was scored against the visiting SUNY Oswego Lakers. There are a number of reasons tennis balls may have been chosen. It is believed that tennis balls were chosen because the Head Coach for Oswego's hockey team was also the school's tennis coach; because tennis balls matched the bright yellow color of the Lakers' jerseys; or because the tennis coach from Oswego State had left to work for Plattsburgh. In 1998, Oswego goaltender Carl Antifonario shutout the Cardinals in Plattsburgh, denying fans the opportunity to throw any tennis balls. This accomplishment led to an Oswego counter-tradition of throwing hundreds of bagels (representing a zero; also said to represent "bird food" for Plattsburgh's mascot: a Cardinal) on their home ice following the first goal scored against the Cardinals in Oswego. The SUNY Plattsburgh tradition of throwing tennis balls at home games against Oswego lasted for 18 years but, following Oswego's lead two years earlier, it was finally ended by school administrators on January 25, 2008.

=== Lacrosse ===
The men's lacrosse team has only won the SUNYAC championship in 2017. As of 2019, there is a women's lacrosse team.

=== Wrestling ===
The Cardinals sponsored a men's wrestling team for eleven seasons, from 1963–64 to 1973–74. They had two winning seasons, 1967 and 1968.

== Student life ==
Undergraduate demographics as of Fall 2023
Race and ethnicity	Total
White	64%
Hispanic	14%
Black	11%
Asian	3%
International student	3%
Two or more races	3%
Unknown	2%
Economic diversity
Low-income (Note: The percentage of students who received an income-based federal Pell grant intended for low-income students.)	39%
Affluent (Note: The percentage of students who are a part of the American middle class at the bare minimum.)	61%

=== Student Association ===
The Student Association, also known as the S.A., is the student-run government body at the college. Their mission is to voice the concerns and interests of the students, as well as provide services, programs, and activities for the college community.

The SUNY Plattsburgh Student Association was founded in 1963 and replaced the former House of Delegates. Then-president of the college, George W. Angell, encouraged student Martin D. Mannix to pitch the idea for a new student run government to the administration and student body. The campus overwhelmingly approved of the changes and Mannix was voted in as the first Student Association President.

=== Honors Student Association ===
The Honors Student Association (HSA) is an independent organization from the college's Student Association. Started in 1984, the HSA acts as the student government for the Redcay Honors Center at Plattsburgh. The HSA organizes and coordinates a wide variety of social activities to benefit the honors students, the campus, and the Plattsburgh community. All students in the Honors College are automatically members of the HSA.

=== Campus media ===
Cardinal Points is the student-run weekly newspaper. In 2007, the Associated Collegiate Press named Cardinal Points as a finalist for the National Scholastic Press Association Pacemaker Award, the highest award given to college media. An October 2015 cover of Cardinal Points gained national attention after being accused of depicting a blackface cartoon.

The Cardinal Yearbook is published by the Journalism department. Plattsburgh State also publishes a local magazine annually, once called All Points North, renamed Do North in 2013. Plattsburgh State Television (PSTV) is the student run television station, and 93.9 WQKE was the student run radio station until its license was cancelled on June 2, 2022. The communications department also runs WARP, a radio station streaming over the cable bulletin board in the Plattsburgh area.

=== Greek life ===
There are several fraternities and sororities on campus. The following nine fraternal organizations have active chapters on campus: Alpha Kappa Lambda, Alpha Phi Alpha, Alpha Sigma Phi, Chi Phi, Delta Sigma Phi, Sigma Tau Gamma, Tau Kappa Epsilon, Theta Gamma, and Zeta Beta Tau. The following sorority organizations have active chapters on campus: Alpha Epsilon Phi, Alpha Phi, Delta Phi Epsilon, Lambda Pi Upsilon, Omega Phi Beta, Sigma Delta Tau, and Theta Phi Alpha.

== Notable alumni ==
=== Broadcasting ===
- Edie Huggins – Long-time television reporter in Philadelphia. Daytime television soap opera and motion picture actress. Class of 1963.

=== Education ===
- Thomas LeBlanc - President of the George Washington University, 2017 – 2021
- Jack Russell Weinstein (1991) - Chester Fritz Distinguished Professor of Philosophy at The University of North Dakota, Author, Radio personality.

=== Literature ===
- Nancy Kress – Science fiction writer best known for her Hugo and Nebula Award-winning novella Beggars in Spain. Class of 1969.

=== Performing arts ===
- Dave Annable – Television actor best known for his roles on Reunion and Brothers & Sisters. Named the No. 7 'Sexiest Men Alive' by People Magazine in 2007.
- Tom Chapin – Grammy Award-winning musician. Class of 1966.
- Bryan O'Byrne – Character actor in movies, television shows, and commercials. Former member of the Emmy Nominating Committee.
- Michael Rispoli – Television actor best known for his role as Jackie Aprile Sr. on The Sopranos. Class of 1982.
- Tim Robbins – Academy Award-winning film actor best known for his roles in Bull Durham and The Shawshank Redemption

=== Politics ===
- Donald Ardell, Member of the Maine House of Representatives
- Doug Hoffman – Republican candidate in the 2009 special election and the Republican Primary of 2010 in the 23rd District races.
- Wallace E. Pierce – U.S. Congressman representing New York's 31st congressional district from 1939 to 1940. Class of 1903.
- Dan Scavino - White House Director of Social Media under President Donald Trump. Class of 1998.
- Anthony Weiner - U.S. Congressman who represented New York's 9th congressional district from 1999 to 2011. Class of 1985.

=== Religion ===
- William Love – The ninth Episcopal bishop of Albany. Class of 1988.

=== Science ===
- Nazia Mintz Habib – Interdisciplinary academic researcher for sustainable development, food security, action research. Class of 2003.

=== Sports ===
- John Daly – Skeleton racer since 2001. Qualified for the 2010 Winter Olympics in Vancouver and named to the 2014 Olympic team. Graduated with a communications degree in 2008.
- Jeff Gadley – Competed in the 1980 Winter Olympics in the four-man bobsleigh. Graduated in 1978.

== Notable faculty and staff ==
- Eliza Kellas – Renowned educator and suffragist.
- Jacques Lemaire – player elected to the Hockey Hall of Fame in 1984.

== Notable events ==
- Peter Frampton's classic rock hit song Baby, I Love Your Way, from the best-selling album Frampton Comes Alive! was recorded live on the campus of SUNY Plattsburgh on November 22, 1975. This Student Association-sponsored concert was held at Memorial Hall.
- On July 10, 1976, the campus of SUNY Plattsburgh served as the official staging area for the United States Olympic Team before leaving for the 1976 Summer Olympics in nearby Montreal, Quebec. President Gerald Ford visited the college campus to address the 425 Olympic athletes outside the Field House.
