= Institute for Manufacturing =

Department of Cambridge University

The Institute for Manufacturing (IfM) is part of the Department of Engineering of the University of Cambridge.

== Location ==
The IfM is located in the Alan Reece building on the University's West Cambridge Site in the United Kingdom. Previously, the Institute was located in the former Cambridge University Press building in Mill Lane before relocating to its current building in West Cambridge in June 2009.
