= Whittle Laboratory =

Research laboratory in Cambridge, England

Coordinates: 52.21209°N 0.09298°E

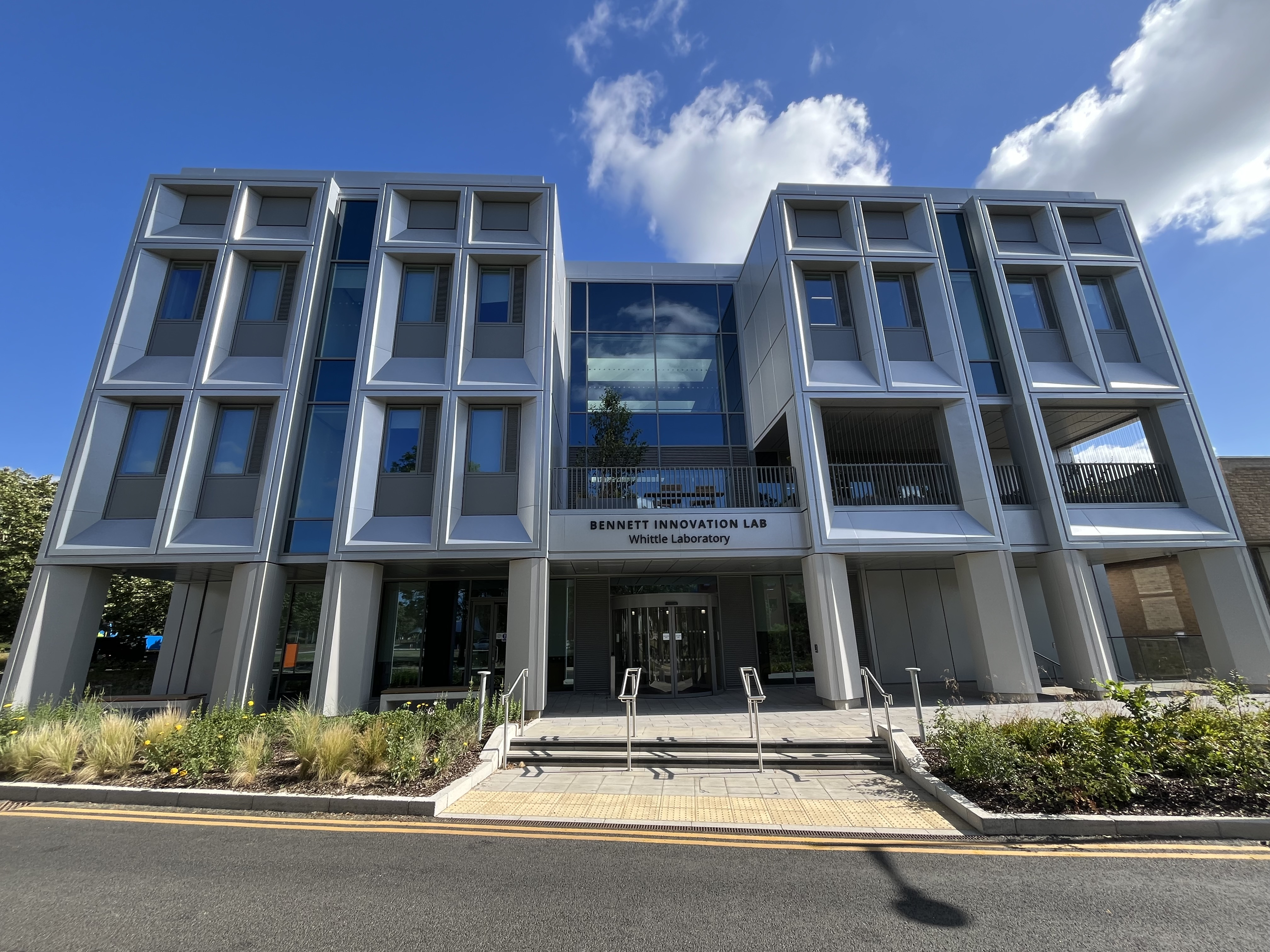
The front of the Whittle Laboratory and Bennet Innovation Lab

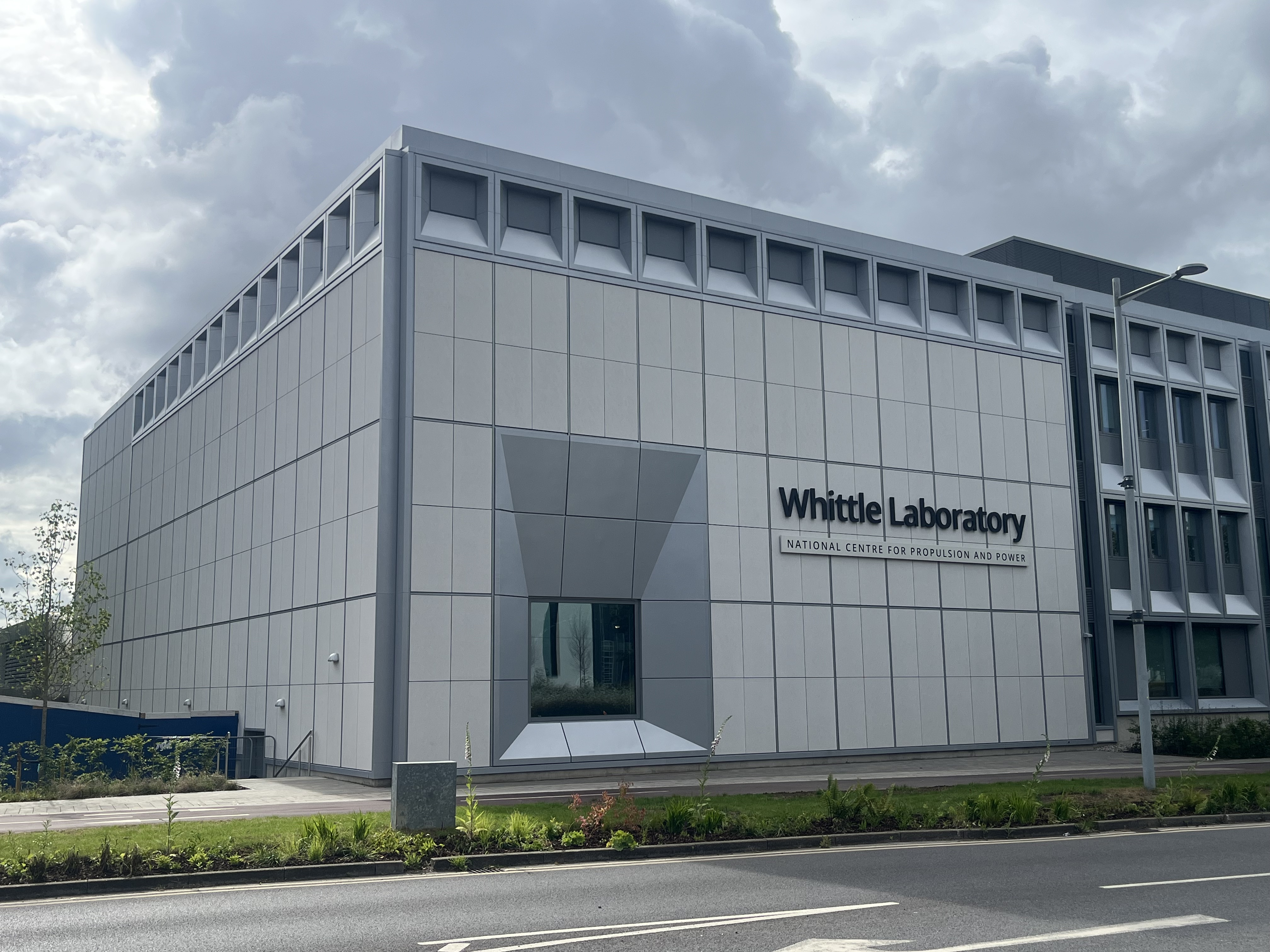
The National Centre for Propulsion and Power

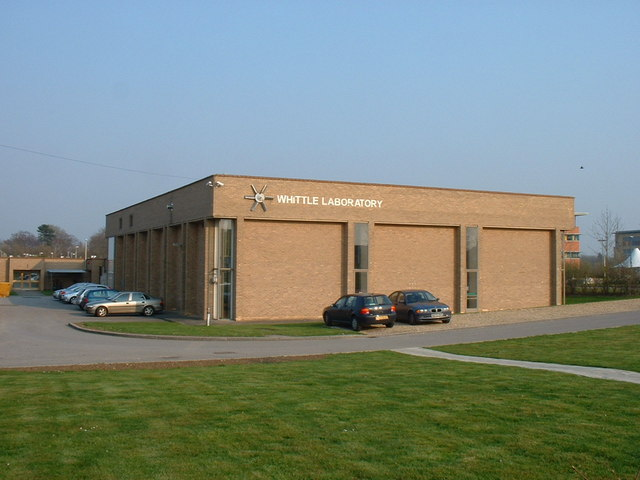
The Whittle Laboratory in 2007, prior to construction of the new lab buildings where the photograph is taken from.

The Whittle Laboratory works on reducing the climate impact of aircraft and power generation. It is located at the West Cambridge site in Cambridge, UK. It is a part of the Department of Engineering, at the University of Cambridge. The Whittle Lab has its origins in Sir Frank Whittle and a number of his original team, from Cambridge, and who in 1937 invented the jet engine. In opening the Lab in 1973 the aim was to develop the technology which would underpin the emerging age of mass air travel. The Whittle Laboratory today is one of the world's leading jet engine and power generation research laboratories. It has partnered with Rolls-Royce, Mitsubishi Heavy Industries, and Siemens for over 50 years; with Dyson for 10 years; and in the last few years with many of the new entrants into the aviation sector. The Whittle Laboratory has successfully translated hundreds of primary research ideas into industrial products and its research has been awarded the American Society of Mechanical Engineers highest honour, the ‘Gas Turbine Award’ 15 times, more than any other institution or company. The current focus of the Laboratory is to accelerate the decarbonisation of flight and energy.

== Origin ==
The Whittle Laboratory was initially set-up with a grant from the Science Research Council by Sir John Horlock who was to become the first director of the lab, and Sir William Hawthorne who was the head of the Cambridge University Engineering Department and who had developed the combustion chamber in Sir Frank Whittle jet engine used in the first British jet aircraft.

== Computational Methods ==
Professor John Denton was one of the first to develop numerical methods for flow calculation in turbomachines using time-marching methods. He was soon joined by Prof Bill Dawes and together the numerical methods that he has developed, including TBLOCK and MULTALL, became widely used around the world receiving many international awards for his work. The advent of CFD was groundbreaking not only because for the first time researchers and designers could calculate the correct loss mechanisms within turbomachines (rather than relying on empirical correlations), but also because the numerical methods could also be used as design tools to improve component efficiencies. The Denton code TBLOCK, a CPU based Navier-Stokes solver for turbomachinery, has since been converted to a code called Turbostream designed to exploit NVIDIA GPUs for massively parallel computations, resulting in a more than 20 times speed up for the same calculation. Turbostream was spun out as a separate company, with the latest version (TS4) now an unstructured code with multi-physics capabilities.

Other computational methods developed in the Lab include 3DNS, a high fidelity flow solver, and dbslice, a JavaScript library for web-based data exploration.

== Experimental facilities ==
The Whittle Lab is home to a number of experimental facilities used to study thermofluid mechanics in turbomachinery, propulsion, power and aviation. These include:

- 5 low speed (M < 0.3) wind tunnels.
- A variable density loop for independent control of Mach and Reynolds.
- 13 compressor, fan, and turbine test facilities, including capabilities for boundary layer ingestion, water ingestion, secondary air bleed and transonic flow.

There are also many smaller rigs used for teaching, probe calibration, real gas dynamics, wind and tidal turbine studies, heat transfer measurement, propulsor performance testing and many other applications. There are manufacturing facilities including 3D printing and CNC machining to support experimental work.

== Industry partnerships ==
Since its origin the Whittle Laboratory primary aim has been to build a bridge across ‘the Valley of Death’ – the place where brilliant primary research is not translated into product. The research partnerships with Rolls-Royce, Mitsubishi Heavy Industries, and Siemens have stretched back more than 50 years. More recently the Whittle Laboratory has partnered with Dyson, Reaction Engines, Lilium and Green Jets. The Lab has also partnered with British Cycling and the ECB on sports aerodynamics in cycling and cricket.

== The New Whittle Laboratory ==
By radically changing both the culture and tools used in technology development, the New Whittle Laboratory is intended to enable research to dramatically cut the time required to achieve net zero flight. Recent pioneering trials at the Whittle Laboratory in collaboration with Rolls-Royce, and funded by the Aerospace Technology Institute, have demonstrated the ability to reduce the time require to design, build and test technologies by a factor of between 10 and 100, from years to months or weeks. This allow research teams to work in a hardware rich environment, failing fast to learn fast. The New Whittle Laboratory is designed to scale this process, acting as a zero carbon technology accelerator. It is intended to be a demonstrator of this technology development process, allowing it to be replicated to other sectors and around the world. The building was designed by Grimshaw Architects.

The New Whittle Laboratory will house the National Centre for Propulsion and Power, providing a new variable density tunnel and rotating test stand as well as the existing experimental facilities, new manufacturing spaces and new office spaces designed to enhance collaboration between researchers, government and industry. King Charles III broke ground on the £58m facility in May 2023, with building work expected to be completed by October 2025.

== International awards ==
The Whittle Laboratory is world’s most academically successful propulsion and power lab. Work from the Lab has won over 100 international awards including the Gas Turbine Award, the American Society of Mechanical Engineers highest honour in the field, 15 times. The award has been made once a year since 1963, with Whittle Lab work winning 10 of the last 20.

Gas Turbine Awards
Year	Recipient	Topic
2019	Masha Folk, Robert Miller, John Coull	The Impact of Combustor Turbulence on Turbine Loss Mechanisms
2016	Svilen Savov, Nicholas Atkins, Sumiu Uchida	A Comparison of Single and Double Lip Rim Seal Geometries
2015	Ho-On To, Robert Miller	The Effect of Aspect Ratio on Compressor Performance
2014	Robert Grewe, Robert Miller, Howard Hodson	The Effect of Endwall Manufacturing Variations on Turbine Performance
2012	Graham Pullan, Anna Young, Ivor Day, Edward Greitzer, Zoltán Spakovszky	Origins and Structure of Spike-Type Rotating Stall
2010	Martin Goodhand, Robert Miller	The Impact of Real Geometries on Three-Dimensional Separations in Compressors
2009	Budimir Rosic, Eric Curtis, John Denton	Controlling Tip Leakage Flow Over a Shrouded Turbine Rotor Using an Air-Curtain
2006	Budimir Rosic, John Denton	The Control of Shroud Leakage Loss by Reducing Circumferential Mixing
2005	Ivor Day, Christopher Freeman, John Williams	Rain Ingestion in Axial Flow Compressors at Part Speed
2004	Ivor Day, Christopher Freeman, Thomas Scarinci	Passive Control of Combustion Instability in a Low Emissions Aeroderivative Gas Turbine
1997	Tim Camp, Ivor Day	A Study of Spike and Modal Stall Phenomena in a Low-Speed Axial Compressor
1991	Ivor Day	Stall Inception in Axial Flow Compressors
1986	Simon Gallimore, Nicholas Cumpsty	Spanwise Mixing in Multistage Axial Flow Compressors
1984	Howard Hodson	Boundary Layer and Loss Measurements on the Rotor of an Axial-Flow Turbine
1977	Ivor Day, Nicholas Cumpsty, Edward Greitzer	Prediction of Compressor Performance in Rotating Stall
