= Nazia Parveen =

Pakistani rock climber

Nazia Parveen is a Pakistani rock climber. She is the first rock climber from the former Federally Administered Tribal Areas (FATA).

== Background ==
Parveen also likes paragliding, badminton, horseback riding, basketball, archery, and handball. Parveen wants to change the image of women in FATA and provide opportunities to the less fortunate boys and girls of the Federally Administered Tribal Areas. Parveen has 5 sisters and 1 brother. Her father was extremely supportive in her pursuit of rock climbing. Parveen has done MPhil in International Relations at National Defense University in Islamabad with a Grade Point Average of 3.94.

== Career ==
Nazia was introduced into rock-climbing when she participated in a rock-climbing event in March 2010. It was a co-ed rock-climbing event arranged at the Margalla Mountains. She had gone there with her university trip. She is reported to have said that she participated then just for fun but realized that rock-climbing was fun and she wanted to continue with it. One year later, Parveen joined the Adventure Club of Pakistan. In 2014, she became the first woman from Pakistan to enter international rock climbing competitions.

=== Hurdles ===
When Nazia first began rock climbing competitively, some of her male counterparts would boycott the competitions that she was participating in.

=== Career achievements ===
Nazia Parveen won first place in 28 consecutive rock climbing competitions by 2014. By 2016, she had won thirty-two consecutive rock-climbing competitions. In four of the twenty-eight competitions, she won by beating the males. In March 2011, Parveen participated in the 5th Pakistan Open Climbing Competition and was awarded with a special trophy for her record-breaking performance. Parveen once participated in the Chenab Rock Climbing Competition and set a record by beating her competition by a lead twelve times greater. In March 2011, she participated in the 5th Pakistan Open Climbing Competition, a national level event. She won the competition and set a record in female categories. She was also the instructor of the Adventure Club of Pakistan after she won five competitions. She was featured in The News Women Power 50 in 2017. Parveen's name is also added in the Pakistan Book of Records.

=== Reaction from locals ===
Parveen's family members and locals were initially perplexed over her choice over rock-climbing. They would often tell her that rock climbing isn't a girl's sport. However, after winning competitions, she started getting support from her extended family and locals. Currently, they are proud of her accomplishments.

=== Government support ===
Parveen wrote a letter to the Governor of Khyber-Pakhtunkhwa asking for help and he announced that he would take care of all the expenses. Parveen believes that further government support is required for more future accomplishments. Pakistan already offers some of the world's best rock-climbing and mountaineering opportunities in the form of the mountain ranges of the Karakoram, Hindukush, and the Himalayas. According to her, rock climbing should be included in the games listed by the Pakistan Sports Board and should also include coaching camps and training programs.

=== Charitable activities ===
Parveen runs two clubs near Islamabad where she conducts training sessions for women. She also gives motivational speeches in universities.
