= John Horlock =

British academic

Sir John Horlock FRS FREng
- Born: John Harold Horlock; 19 April 1928; Edmonton, Middlesex
- Died: 22 May 2015
- Education: University of Cambridge
- Spouse: Sheila Stutely (m. 1953)
- Children: Alison, Tim, Jane
- Parent(s): Harold and Olive Horlock
- Engineering career
- Discipline: Turbomachinery
- Institutions: University of Liverpool; University of Salford; Whittle Laboratory

Sir John Harold Horlock FRS FREng (19 April 1928 – 22 May 2015) was a British professor of mechanical engineering, and was vice-chancellor of both the Open University and the University of Salford, as well as vice-president of the Royal Society. In 1977, he was elected a fellow of the Royal Academy of Engineering

== Education and early life ==
Horlock was raised in North London and attended The Latymer School, Edmonton. He went from there to St John's College, Cambridge where he gained his PhD in 1958.

== Career ==
In spite of a job offer by Rolls-Royce, Horlock accepted the role of professor and head of the mechanical engineering department at University of Liverpool. He returned to Cambridge as professor of engineering in 1967, and in 1973 he founded the department's Whittle Laboratory, also becoming its director.

In 1981, Horlock began working for the Open University. Whilst there he tackled the government over spending cuts, introduced a taught postgraduate masters programme, and expanded the OU. Following his retirement he was treasurer and later vice-president of the Royal Society.

== Research ==
Horlock's main area of research was turbomachinery, particularly gas turbines, compressors and jet engines.

=== Selected books and book chapters ===
- Horlock, John H (2006). An Open Book. South Shields, UK: the Memoir Club. ISBN 9781841041582.
- Horlock, John H (1958). Axial flow compressors fluid mechanics & thermodynamics. Oxford, UK: Butterworth & Co Publishers Ltd.
- Horlock, John H (1966). Axial flow turbines. Oxford, UK: Butterworth & Co Publishers Ltd. ISBN 9780408122504.
- Horlock, John H (1973). Axial flow compressors, fluid mechanics and thermodynamics. Huntington, N.Y: R.E. Krieger Pub. Co. ISBN 9780882750965.
- Horlock, John H (1978). Actuator disk theory: discontinuities in thermo fluid dynamics. London New York: McGraw-Hill. ISBN 9780070303607.
- Horlock, John H (1997). Cogeneration—combined heat and power (CHP): thermodynamics and economics. Malabar, Fla: Krieger Pub. ISBN 9780894649288.
- Horlock, John H (2002). Combined power plants: including combined cycle gas turbine (CCGT) plants. Malabar, FL: Krieger Pub. ISBN 9781575241975.
- Horlock, John H (1997), "Keynote address", in Hah, Chunhill (ed.), Turbomachinery fluid dynamics and heat transfer: based on the proceedings of the symposium held at the Pennsylvania State University, University Park, Pennsylvania, June 13–14, 1995: on the occasion of Dr. B. Lakshminarayana's 60th birthday, New York: M. Dekker, pp. 1–12, ISBN 9780824798291

=== Selected journal articles ===
- Horlock, John H (March 1963). "Annulus wall boundary layers in axial compressor stages". Journal of Fluids Engineering. 85 (1): 55–62. doi:10.1115/1.3656537.
- Horlock, John H; Henderson, Robert E (October 1972). "An approximate analysis of the unsteady lift on airfoils in cascade". Journal of Engineering for Gas Turbines and Power. 94 (4): 233–240. doi:10.1115/1.3445678.
- Horlock, John H; Grainger, CF (September 1980). "Linearized solutions for the supersonic flow through turbomachinery blade rows (using actuator disk theory)". Journal of Fluids Engineering. 102 (3): 330–337. doi:10.1115/1.3240690.
- Horlock, John H (January 1997). "Aero-engine derivative gas turbines for power generation: thermodynamic and economic perspectives". Journal of Engineering for Gas Turbines and Power. 119 (1): 119–123. doi:10.1115/1.2815534.
- Horlock, John H; Cumpsty, Nicholas A (2005). "Averaging Non-Uniform Flow for a Purpose". Volume 6: Turbo Expo 2005, Parts A and B. Vol. 6. American Society of Mechanical Engineers. pp. 1–14. doi:10.1115/GT2005-68081. ISBN 978-0-7918-4730-5.
- Horlock, John H; Torbidoni, Leonardo (January 2008). "Calculations of cooled turbine efficiency". Journal of Engineering for Gas Turbines and Power. 130 (1): 011703. doi:10.1115/1.2771250.

== Honours and awards ==
Horlock won numerous awards including:

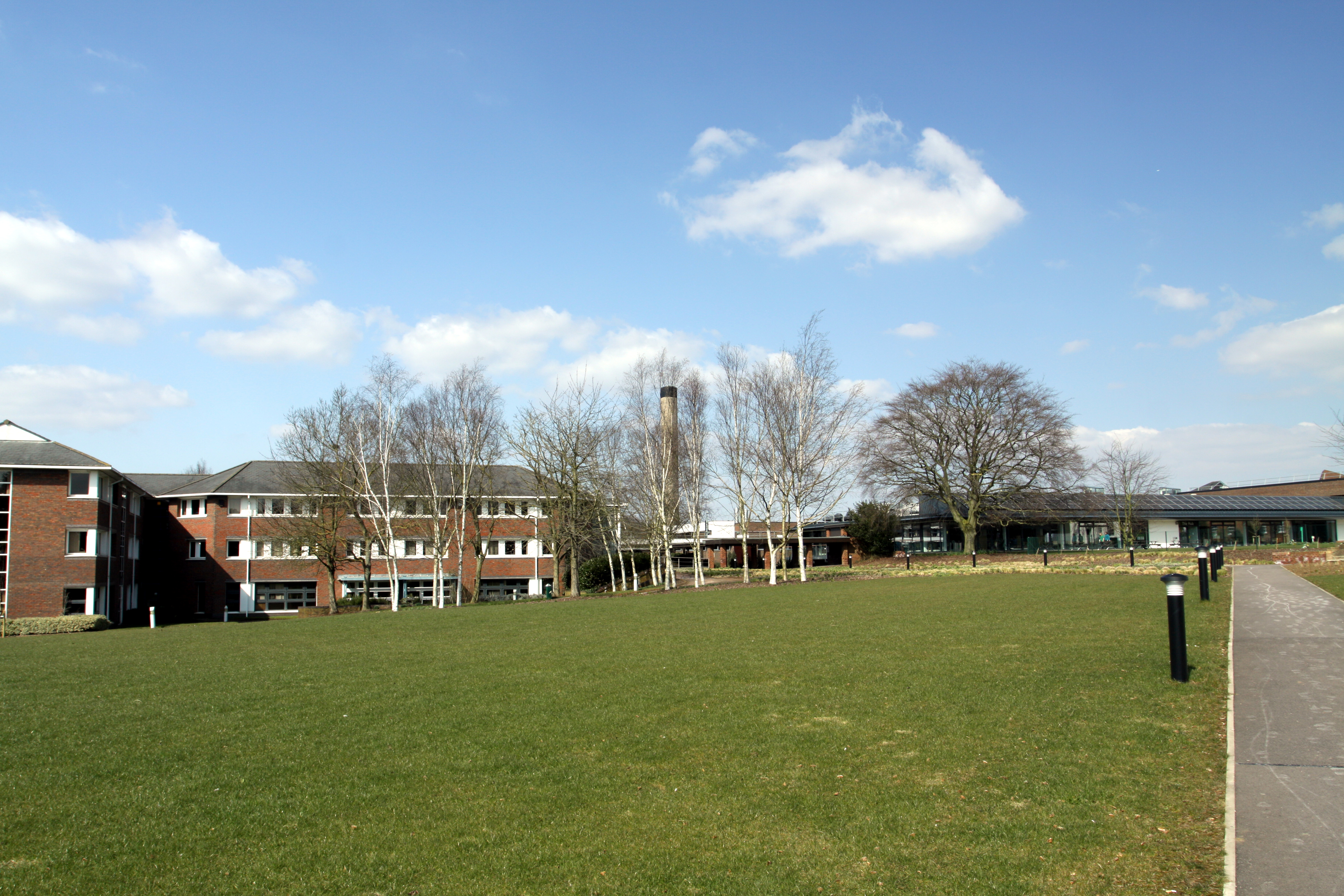
The Horlock Building, named after John Horlock, Open University's Walton Hall Campus, Milton Keynes.

- Elected a Fellow of the Royal Society (FRS) in 1976
- 1980 received an Honorary Doctorate from Heriot-Watt University
- Elected to the National Academy of Engineering in 1988
- 1996 He was given a knighthood in the 1996 New Year Honours, for services to science, engineering and education.
- 2001 James Alfred Ewing Medal from the Institution of Civil Engineers

The Horlock building on the Open University's Walton Hall campus was named in his honour in 1989, and the Association of Open University Graduates' Sir John Horlock Award for Science was established two years later in 1991.
