= Alexander Enyedi =

Canadian plant biologist and academic administrator

11th President of the State University of New York at Plattsburgh
- Incumbent
- Assumed office January 21, 2020
- Preceded by: Josee Larochelle (acting)

Personal details
- Born: Canada
- Education: University of Guelph (BS, MS); Pennsylvania State University (PhD)

Alexander Enyedi is a Canadian plant biologist and academic administrator serving as the 11th president of the State University of New York at Plattsburgh.

== Early life and education ==
A native of Canada, Enyedi earned a Bachelor of Science and Master of Science from University of Guelph in Ontario. Enyedi then earned a doctorate in plant pathology and biochemistry from Pennsylvania State University.

== Career ==
Enyedi began his career as an assistant professor of plant biology at Western Michigan University. Serving as a member of the faculty for 22 years, he later became a dean of the WMU College of Arts and Sciences. Enyedi then relocated to Northern California to serve as provost and vice president for academic affairs at Humboldt State University. Enyedi was selected to serve as president of State University of New York at Plattsburgh by the State University of New York Board of Trustees on November 20, 2019. He took office on January 21, 2020, succeeding John Ettling.
