= Norman Fleck =

British engineer (born 1958)

Professor Norman Fleck FRS FREng FIMMM
- Born: Norman Andrew Fleck; 11 May 1958 (age 68)
- Education: University of Cambridge
- Known for: Engineering
- Title: Professor of Mechanics of Materials, University of Cambridge
- Awards: Timoshenko Medal 2025; William Prager Medal 2023; Charles Russ Richards Memorial Award 2022 EUROMECH Solid Mechanics Prize 2015

Norman Andrew Fleck (born 11 May 1958) is a British scientist and engineer, Professor, and Director of the Cambridge Centre for Micromechanics. He is a Fellow of Pembroke College, Cambridge, and of the Royal Academy of Engineering.

He earned a B.A. (1979) and Ph.D. (1983) from the University of Cambridge.

Professor Fleck was President of IUTAM 2020-2024 https://iutam.org/

In December 2020, Fleck reported on the condition of London's Hammersmith Bridge suggesting that its closure may have been overly cautious, and that, after minimal work, the bridge could be reopened to cyclists and pedestrians.
