= Institute of Theoretical Geophysics =

English research institute

The Institute of Theoretical Geophysics (ITG) is a research institute at the University of Cambridge, England.

Most of the ITG's members are also members of DAMTP or the Department of Earth Sciences. Its research is chiefly on various aspects of geophysical fluid mechanics, as well as other aspects of geophysics such as vulcanology and tectonics.

The ITG was founded in 1989. Its director is Herbert Huppert, and other senior members include Grae Worster and John Lister.
