= William Gates Building, Cambridge =

William Gates Building
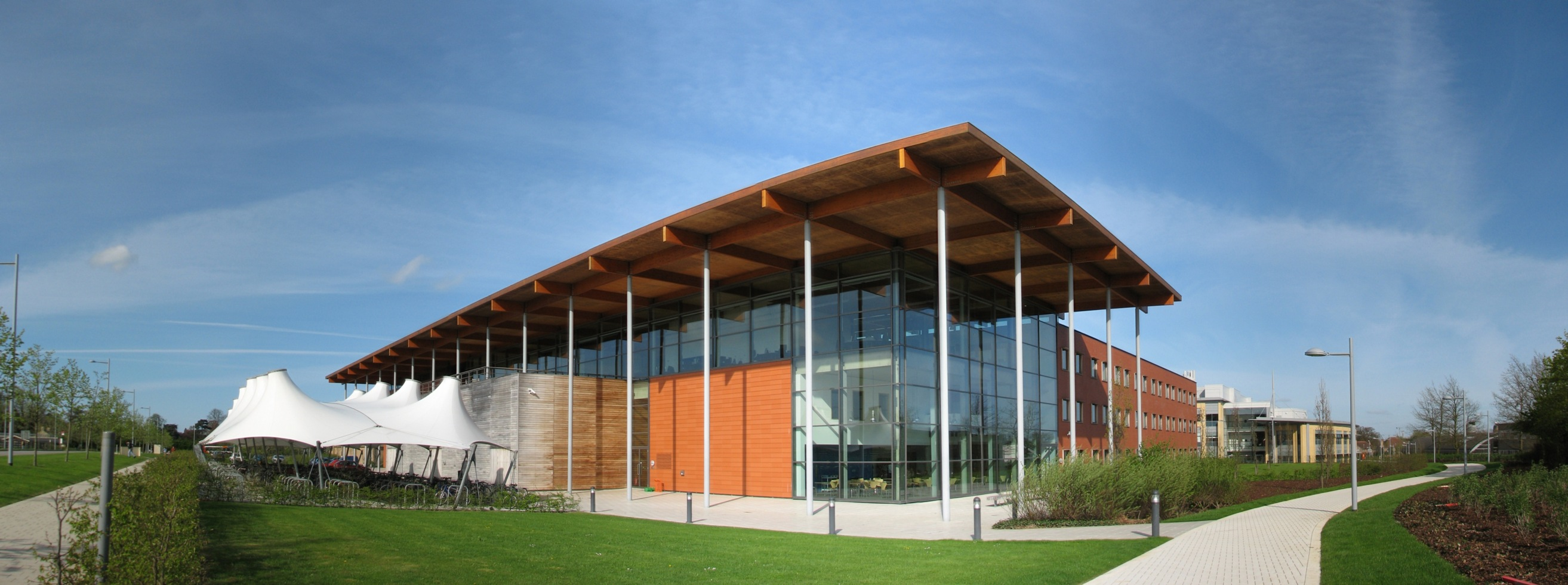
- Interactive map of William Gates Building

General information
- Status: Completed
- Location: 15 JJ Thomson Avenue, Cambridge, England
- Coordinates: 52.2110°N 0.0919°E
- Completed: 2001
- Cost: £20 million
- Owner: University of Cambridge

Height
- Top floor: 2
- Awards and prizes: Bronze Green Impact Award

The William Gates Building, or WGB, is a square building that houses the Computer Laboratory at the University of Cambridge, on the University's West Cambridge site in JJ Thomson Avenue south of the Madingley Road in Cambridge, England. Construction on the building began in 1999 and was completed in 2001 at a cost of £20 million. Opened by Maurice Wilkes, it was named after William H. Gates Sr., the father of Microsoft founder Bill Gates. The Bill & Melinda Gates Foundation provided 50% of the money for the building's construction.

== Building features ==
The building has the following features:

- The glass wall in the "fishbowl," a communal seating area in the building, is decorated with a paper-tape representation of the original EDSAC "Initial Orders" (boot program) written by David Wheeler and of a program written by Maurice Wilkes in 1949 to compute squares
- The building's main thoroughfare, called "The Street", has tiles that match the binary, UTF-8 representation of 'Computer Laboratory — AD 2001 — ☺'
- The fishbowl contains the original door to the Mathematical laboratory

== Energy efficiency ==
The William Gates Building aims to be energy-efficient. Its energy-saving measures include:

- Aggressive sleep scheduling of desktop computers.
- Use of a chilled-beam convection-based cooling system, with Oventrop valves, to cool rooms in the summer, and warm the floor above in the winter.
- Turning off lights in corridors, and the street, using motion sensors.

== See also ==
- Carnegie Mellon School of Computer Science, USA
- Gates Computer Science Building, Stanford, USA
