= Gates Computer Science Building, Stanford =

Coordinates: 37°25′48″N 122°10′24″W

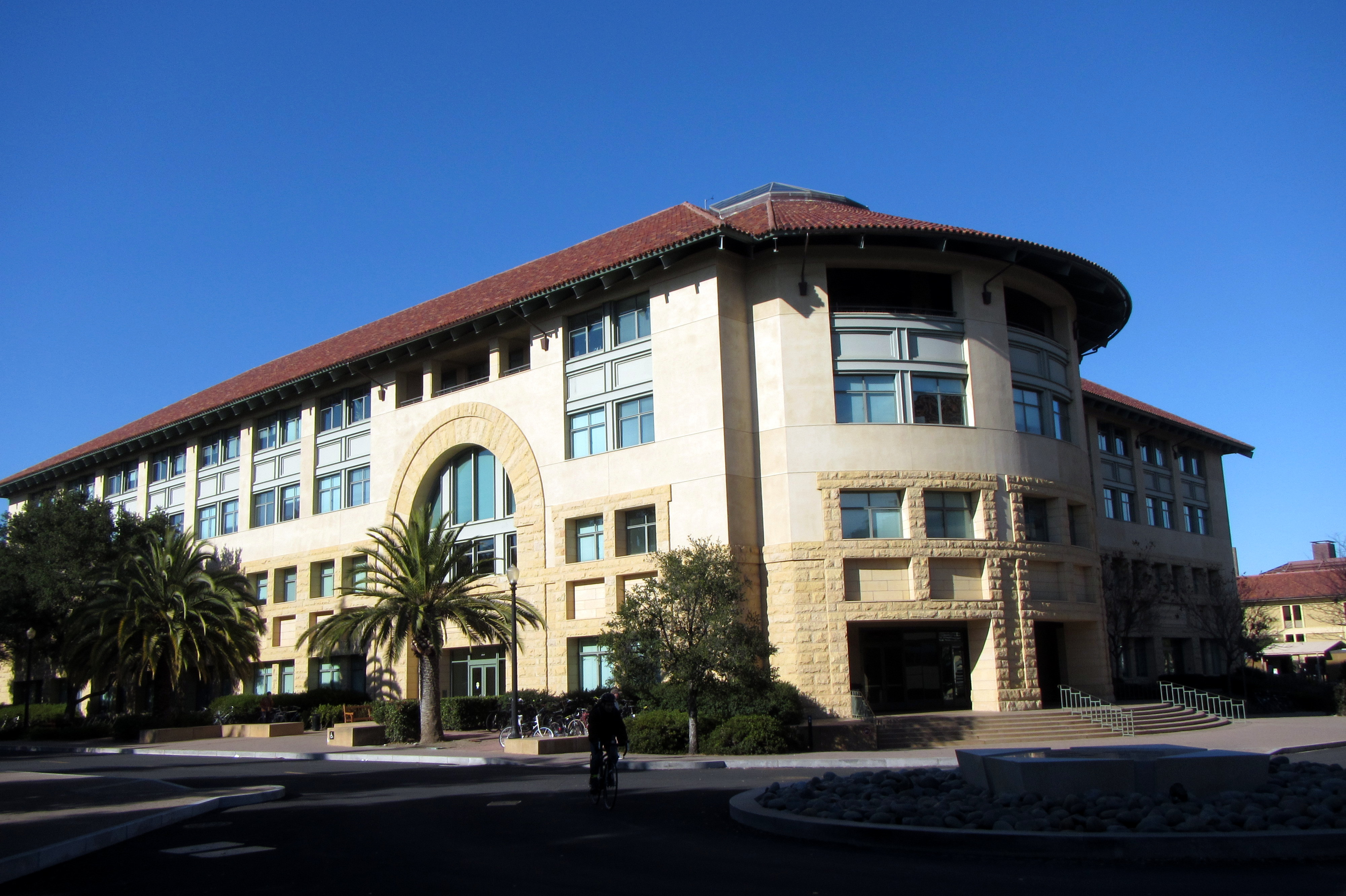
Gates Computer Science Building, Stanford.

The Gates Computer Science Building, or Gates building for short, is an L-shaped building that houses the Computer Science Department as well as the Institute for Human-Centered Artificial Intelligence (HAI) at 353 Jane Stanford Way, Stanford University, California. Construction on the building began in 1994 and was completed in 1996 at a cost of $36 million. It was named after Microsoft founder Bill Gates, who donated $6 million for the building's construction.

The building is organized into an A wing (the western ell) and a B wing (the northern ell). Blueprints of the building are available online. The building was designed by Robert A.M. Stern Architects of New York City. The building was renovated in 2020–2021, while many Stanford buildings were closed due to the COVID-19 pandemic.

In 1996, Stanford graduate students Larry Page and Sergey Brin developed what would become Google in the just-completed Gates building. The company's unusual name was born in a September 1997 brainstorming session in room 360 in the B wing.

== See also ==
- Knowledge Systems Laboratory

== Bibliography ==
- Joncas, Richard; David J. Neuman; Paul V. Turner (1999). Stanford University. Princeton, New Jersey: Princeton Architectural Press. p. 146.
