= Stephen Bourne =

Stephen Bourne may refer to:

- Stephen Bourne (writer) (born 1957), British writer, film and social historian
- Stephen R. Bourne (born 1944), British-born computer scientist
