= Oric (computer) =

UK-manufactured 8-bit computer

Oric-1
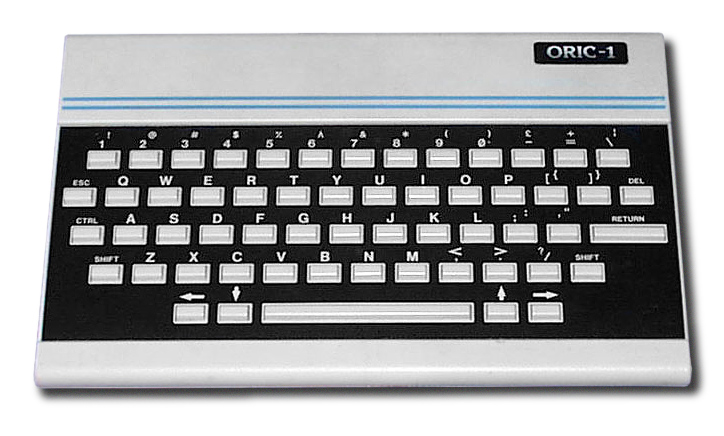
- Developer: Tangerine Computer Systems
- Manufacturer: Tangerine Computer Systems
- Type: Home computer
- Generation: 8-bit
- Released: United Kingdom: 1 September 1982; 44 years ago
- Discontinued: 1984
- Units sold: 210,000 in 1983
- Media: Cassette tape, Floppy disk
- Operating system: Oric Extended Basic v1.0
- CPU: 6502A @ 1 MHz
- Memory: 16 KB / 48 KB
- Display: 40×28 text characters; 240×200 pixels, 8 colours
- Graphics: Custom ASIC (HCS 10017 ULA)
- Sound: AY-3-8912
- Predecessor: Tangerine Microtan 65
- Successor: Oric Atmos

Oric Atmos
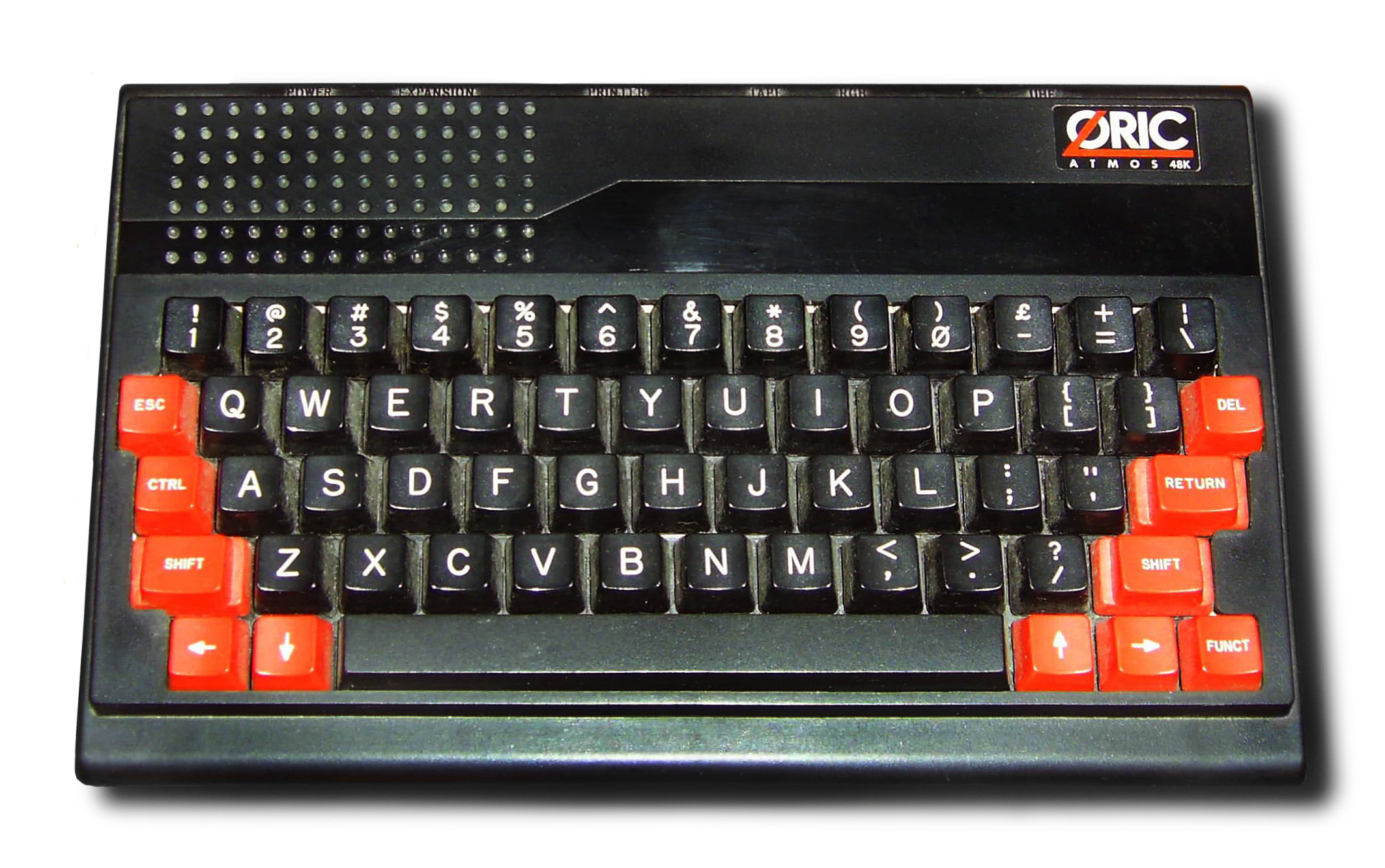
- Developer: Tangerine Computer Systems
- Manufacturer: Tangerine Computer Systems
- Type: Home computer
- Generation: 8-bit
- Released: United Kingdom: 1 February 1984; 42 years ago
- Discontinued: 1985
- Media: Cassette tape, Floppy disk
- Operating system: Oric Extended Basic V1.1
- CPU: 6502A @ 1 MHz
- Memory: 16 KB / 48 KB (16 KB more available with hardware hack)
- Predecessor: Oric-1
- Successor: Oric Stratos

Oric Telestrat
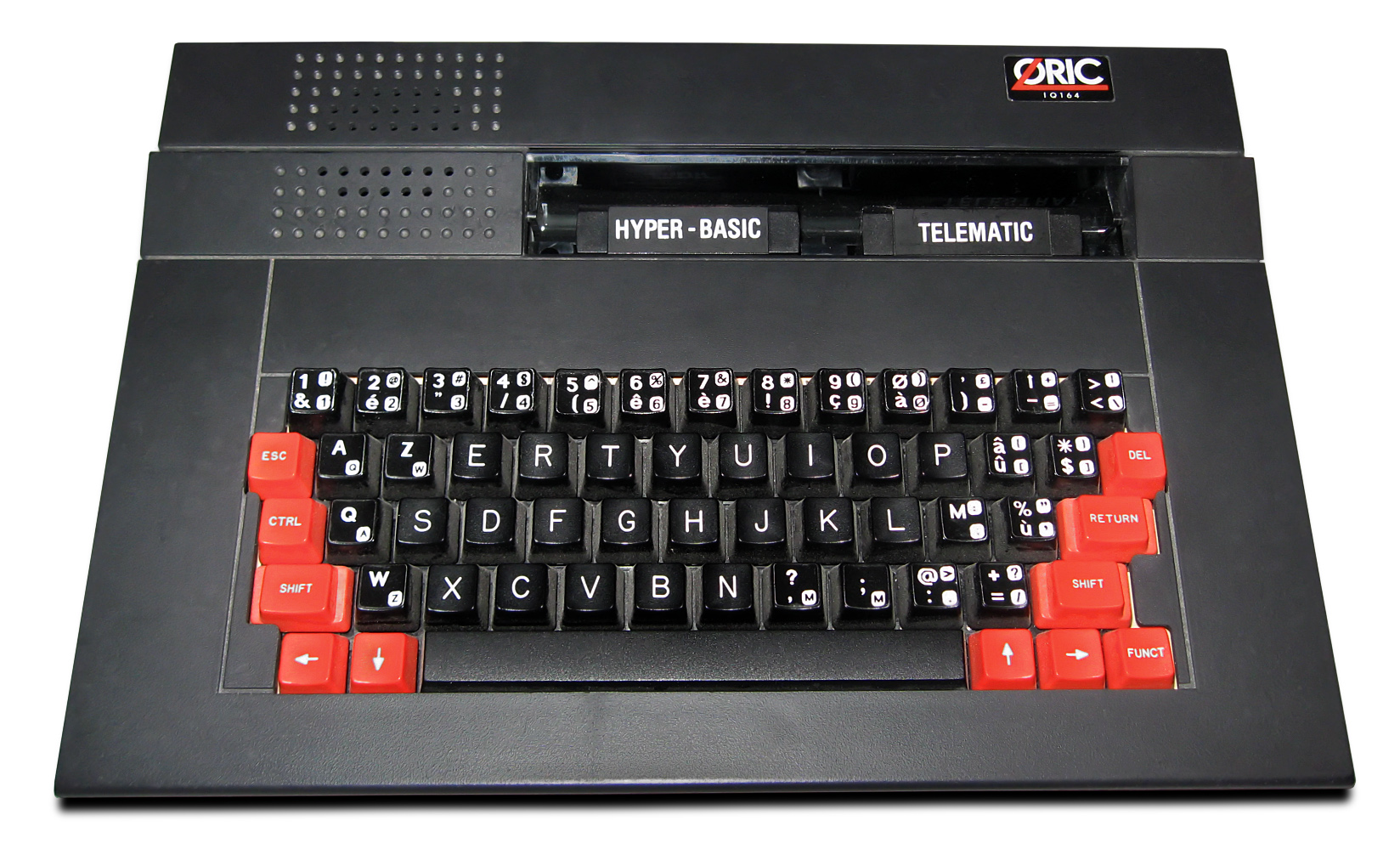
- Developer: Eureka Informatique
- Manufacturer: Eureka Informatique
- Type: Home computer
- Generation: 8-bit
- Released: 1986
- Discontinued: 1988
- Units sold: 6,000
- Media: Cassette tape, Floppy disk
- Operating system: HyperBasic
- CPU: 6502A @ 1 MHz
- Memory: 64 KB
- Predecessor: Oric Atmos

Oric was a brand of home computers sold in the 1980s by Tangerine Computer Systems. Tangerine was based in the United Kingdom and sold their computers primarily in Europe. All computers in the Oric line were based on the MOS Technology 6502A microprocessor.

With the success of the ZX Spectrum from Sinclair Research, Tangerine's backers suggested a home computer and Tangerine formed Oric Products International Ltd to develop the Oric-1. The computer was introduced in 1982. During 1983, approximately 160,000 Oric-1 computers were sold in the UK, plus another 50,000 in France (where it was the year's top-selling machine). This resulted in Oric being acquired and given funding for a successor model, the 1984 Oric Atmos.

Oric was bought by Eureka, which produced the less successful Oric Telestrat (1986). Oric was dissolved the year the Telestrat was released. Eastern European legal clones of Oric machines were produced into the 1990s.

== Models ==
=== Oric-1 ===
Based on a 1 MHz MOS Technology 6502 CPU, the Oric-1 came in 16 KB or 48 KB RAM variants for £129 and £169 respectively, matching the models available for the popular ZX Spectrum and undercutting the price of the 48 KB version of the Spectrum by a few pounds. The circuit design requires 8 memory chips, one chip per data line of the CPU. Due to the sizing of readily available memory chips the 48 KB model has 8 * 8 KB (64 KBit) chips, making a total of 64 KB. As released only 48 KB is available to the user, with the top 16 KB of memory overlaid by the BASIC ROM; The optional disc drive unit contains some additional hardware that allows it to enable or disable the ROM, effectively adding 16 KB of RAM to the machine. This additional memory is used by the system to store the Oric DOS software. Both Oric-1 versions have a 16 KB ROM containing the operating system and a modified BASIC interpreter.

The Oric-1 has a sound chip, the programmable General Instrument AY-3-8910.

Two graphics modes are handled by a semi-custom ASIC (HCS 10017 ULA) which also manages the interface between the processor and memory. The two modes are a "LORES" (low resolution) text mode (though the character set can be redefined to produce graphics) with 28 rows of 40 characters and a "HIRES" (high resolution) mode with 200 rows of 240 pixels above three lines of text. Like the Spectrum, the Oric-1 suffers from attribute clash–albeit to a much lesser degree in HIRES mode, since 2 different colours can be defined for each 6×1 block of 6 pixels,

The system has a built-in television RF modulator as well as RGB output. A standard audio tape recorder can be used for external storage. There is a Centronics compatible printer interface.

==== Technical details ====
- CPU: MOS 6502 @ 1 MHz
- Operating system: Tangerine/Microsoft Extended Basic v1.0
- ROM: 16 KB
- RAM: 16 KB / 48 KB
- Sound: AY-3-8912
- Graphics: 40×28 text characters/ 240×200 pixels, 8 colours
- Storage: tape recorder, 300 and 2400 baud
- Input: integrated keyboard
- Connectivity: Tape recorder I/O, Centronics compatible printer port, RGB video out, RF out, expansion port
- Voltage: 9 V
- Power consumption: Max 600 milliamps

=== Oric Atmos ===
In late 1983 the funding cost for continued development of Oric caused external funding to be sought, and eventually led to a sale to Edenspring Investments PLC. The Edenspring money enabled Oric International to release the Oric Atmos, which added an improved keyboard and an updated V1.1 ROM to the Oric-1. The faulty tape error checking routine was still there (See "Cassette Interface" under Technical specification, below).

Soon after the Atmos was released, the modem, printer and 3-inch floppy disk drive originally promised for the Oric-1 were announced and released by the end of 1984. A short time after the release of the Atmos machine, a modification for the Oric-1 was issued and advertised in magazines and bulletin boards. This modification enabled the Oric-1 user to add a second ROM (containing the Oric Atmos system) to a spare ROM-socket on the Oric-1 circuit board. Then, using a switch, the users could then switch between the new Oric Atmos ROM and the original Oric-1 ROM. This was desirable since the updated ROM of the Atmos contained breaking changes for some games which relied on certain behaviours or memory addresses within the ROM. This led to tape based software often containing a 1.1 ROM/Atmos version of the software on one side of the cassette, with a 1.0 ROM/Oric-1 version on the other. Earlier titles from publishers that no longer existed or had stopped producing software for the Oric were unlikely to be updated.

=== Oric Stratos and Oric Telestrat ===
Although the Oric Atmos had not turned around Oric International's fortunes, in February 1985, they announced several models including the Oric Stratos/IQ164. Despite their backers putting them into receivership the following day, Oric was bought by French company Eureka, which continued to produce the Stratos, followed by the Oric Telestrat in late 1986.

The Stratos and Telestrat increased the RAM to 64 KB and added more ports, but kept the same processor and graphics and sound hardware as the Oric-1 and Atmos.

The Telestrat is a telecommunications-oriented machine. It comes with a disk drive as standard, and only connects to an RGB monitor / TV. The machine is backward compatible with the Oric-1 and Oric Atmos by using a cartridge. Most of the software is in French, including Hyper-BASIC's error messages. Up to 6000 units were sold in France.

In December 1987, after announcing the Telestrat 2, Oric International went into receivership for the second and final time.

== Technical specification ==
Controller and DOS architecture for Oric computers

=== Keyboard ===
The keyboard has 57 moving keys with tactile feedback. It is capable of full upper and lower case with a correctly positioned space bar. It has a full typewriter pitch. The key layout is a standard QWERTY with ESC, CTRL, RETURN and additional cursor control keys. All keys have auto repeat.

=== Display ===
The display adapter will drive a PAL UHF colour or black and white television receiver on approximately Channel 36. RGB output is also provided on a 5-pin DIN 41524 socket.

==== Character mode ====
In character mode the Oric displays 28 lines of 40 characters, producing a display very similar to Teletext. The character set is standard ASCII which is enhanced by the addition of 80 user-definable characters. ASCII characters may also be re-defined as these are down loaded into RAM on power-up. Serial attributes are used to control display features, as in Teletext, and take up one character position. All remaining characters on that line are affected by the serial attribute until either the line ends or another serial attribute.

Display features are:

- Select background colour (paper) from one of eight.
- Select foreground colour (ink) from one of eight.
- Flash characters on and off approximately twice a second.
- Produce double height characters (even line top, odd line bottom).
- Switch over to user-definable character set. This feature is used to produce Teletext-style colour graphics without the need for additional RAM.

Available colours are black, blue, red, magenta, green, cyan, yellow, and white.

Each character position also has a parallel attribute, which may be operated on a character by character basis, to produce video inversion. The display has a fixed black border.

==== Screen graphics mode ====
The graphics mode consists of 200 pixels vertically by 240 pixels horizontally plus 3 lines of 40 characters (the same as character mode) at the bottom of the screen to display system information and to act as a window on the user program while still viewing the graphics display. It can also be used to input direct commands for graphics and see the effect instantly without having to switch modes. The graphics display operates with serial attributes in the same way as characters, except that the display is now considered as 200 lines by 40 graphics cells. Each graphic cell is therefore very flexible by having 8 foreground and 8 background colours and flashing patterns. The video invert parallel attribute is also usable in this mode. ASCII characters may be painted over the graphics area, thus enabling the free mixing of graphics and text.

=== Sound ===
The Oric has an internal loudspeaker and amplifier and can also be connected to external amplifiers via the 7-pin DIN 45329 shared with the cassette interface. A General Instruments AY-3-8912 provides 3 channel sound.

For BASIC programs, four keywords generate pre-made sounds: PING, SHOOT, EXPLODE, and ZAP. The commands SOUND, MUSIC, and PLAY produce a broader range of sounds.

=== Cassette interface ===
The cassette recorder connects via a 7-pin DIN 45329 socket shared with the external sound output. The interface includes support for tape motor control. Recording speeds offered as standard are 300 baud or 2400 baud. A tone leader allows tape recorders' automatic level control to stabilise before the filename, followed by the actual data with parity; finally, checksums are recorded to allow overall verification of the recording.

The circuit was designed using a Schmitt trigger to remove noise and make input more reliable. The system allows for verification of stored information against the tape copy, to ensure integrity before the information is flushed from memory. There was however a bug within the error-checking of recorded programs, often causing user-created programs to fail when loaded back in; this bug persisted in the updated ROMs for the Oric Atmos.

Available basic commands are CLOAD, CSAVE (for programs and memory dumps), STORE, RECALL (for arrays of string, integer or real, added with Oric Atmos roms). Filenames up to 16 characters can be specified. Options on the commands exist for slow speed, verification, autorunning of programs or specification of start and ending addresses for dumping memory.

=== Expansion port ===
The expansion port allows full access to the CPU's data address and control lines. This allows connection of add-ons specifically designed for the Oric, including user designed hardware. The range of lines exposed allows external ROM and RAM expansion, thus allowing for ROM cartridges or for expansion devices to internally include the required operating software on ROM.

=== Printer port ===
The printer port is compatible with the then standard Centronics parallel interface allows for connection of many different types of printers from low quality (e.g. low-resolution thermal printers) to high quality printers, such as fixed font daisy wheel printers or laser printers, though the latter were uncommon and expensive during the period of commercial availability of the Oric range. Most contemporary computer printers could produce text output without requiring specific drivers, and often followed de facto standards for simple graphics. More advanced use of the printer would have required a specific driver which, given the proliferation of different home computers and standards of the time, may or may not have been available.

== Peripherals ==
=== Colour plotter ===
Tangerine's MCP-40 is a plotter with mechanics by Alps Electric. The same mechanism was also used as the basis for similar low-cost plotters produced by various home computer manufacturers around that time. These included the Atari 1020, the Commodore 1520, the Tandy/Radio Shack CGP-115, the Texas Instruments HX-1000, the Mattel Aquarius 4615, and probably also the Sharp MZ-1P16 (for MZ-800 series).

=== Prestel adaptor ===
The Prestel adaptor produced by Eureka (Informatika) was the first adaptor produced for the Oric-1 and Oric Atmos computers. However this adaptor was only furnished with very limited software.

== Games ==
There where 589 commercially released games for the Oric, between 1983 and 1987.

Title	Year	Publisher
10k Othello		Epsilon
10k Star Trek		Epsilon
12k Backgammon		Epsilon
16/48K Orical Games Pack 1		Dormere
1815	1984	Cobra Soft
3D Battlestar	1983	Topaz
3D Fongus	1985	Loriciels
3D Hover		Loriciels
3D Maze/Breakout	1983	IJK Software
3D Munch	1984	Loriciels
3D Noughts and Crosses (Epsilon)		Epsilon
3D Noughts and Crosses (IJK)	1984	IJK Software
3D OXO / Backgammon	1984	IJK Software
4 Jeux Different		Squirelle
5 Alike		PASE
5 Alike / Othello		Epsilon
50 Games		UTS
A.T.M (Air Terre Mer)	1985	Cobra Soft
Ace in the H.O.L.E		Add On
Acheron's Rage / La Rage d'Acheron	1983	Prism
Action 6		Touchstone
Adventure Quest	1983	Level 9 Computing
Adventureland		PASE
L'Aigle d'Or	1984	Loriciels
Airfox		A & F Software
Airline	1983	Strategy Games
Alien		TRAN
Amazea		Quark Data
Anaconda		Headfield
L'Antre de la Peur	1984	ERE Informatique
Arcade n°2		Tansoft
Arcaine Quest		Add On
Arena 3000	1984	Microdeal
Arrow of Death Part 1		Channel 8 Software
Arrow of Death Part 2	1983	Channel 8 Software
Arsene Lapin	1984	Infogrames
Asteroids		Artic Computing
Asteroidy		A & F Software
Astrowar		Microdeal
Atlantid	1984	Sprites
Atlantis	1985	Cobra Soft
Atmostar		Kenema
Attack of the Cybermen	1984	IJK Software
Les Aventures de Lilla et Jacky	1984	Micropuce
Awari	1983	Kenema
Baby Boum		Sprites
Baguettes	1983	ASN Diffusion
Bandit	1983	Express Software
Bar Blaster		Byteland
Base Mercure	1983	ASN informatique
Bataille Navale		ASN Diffusion
Battleship Control		Epsilon
Bering	1984	Dialog
Big Baston		Sprites
Billiard		Vismo
Bingo		GPD Software
Bla Bla Bla		Micropuce
Black Box	1983	ASN Diffusion
Blockbuster	1984	Dream Software
Blowtorch Blaster		Touchstone
Bolide		A & F Software
Bombyx		Dialog
Bozy Boa	1983	CDS Micro Systems
Brad Rescues the Professor	1983	Express Software
Breakout / Surrounded / Missile		Express Software
Bricky	1983	Breakpoint
Bridge Player		CP Software
Brique a Brac	1984	Marco Polo
Buccaneer	1986	FGC
Bugs Buster	1985	Free Game Blot
Businessman	1984	ERE Informatique
Calculus		Loriciels
Canada	1984	Soracom / Micrologic
Candyfloss / Hangman	1983	IJK Software
Canonnade / Oric Pot		Micro Programmes 5
Captains Log		Chymesoft
Carmaniac	1983	Micropuce
Carn-3	1983	Loriciels
Carnaval	1983	Proriciel
Casin'Oric	1984	Micro Programmes 5
Caspak	1983	Loriciels
Casse Brique		Loriciels
Casse Tête		Tran
Cassette 50	1983	Cascade
The Castle	1983	Bugbyte
Catch A Key		Mellowsoft
Categ-Oric	1983	No Man's Land
Cave Quest	1983	Tevward Microtech
Centipede / Mille-Pattes	1983	PSS
Centrale Nucleaire		Shift Editions
Challenge Voile	1984	Loriciels
Champions		Peaksoft
Chef		Sprites
La Chenille Infernale	1983	Loriciels
Cheops	1984	Marco Polo
Chess (IJK)	1984	IJK Software
Chess / Echecs	1983	Loriciels
Chess II	1984	Tansoft
Chopper	1984	Seven Software
Chuckford	1986	FGC
Circuit Oric		ASN Diffusion
Circus	1983	Channel 8 Software
Ciros	1983	ASN Diffusion
Citadelle	1984	Loriciels
La Cité de Cristal		Bleu Ciel Informatique
La Cité Maudite	1984	ERE Informatique
Classic Racing	1984	Salamander Software
Cluster Controller		Ciro Soft
Cobra		Norsoft
Cobra Pinball		Cobra Soft
Cock In	1984	Prism
Code Breaker		Headfield
Coloric	1984	Free Game Blot
Colossal Adventure	1983	Level 9 Computing
Concours Hippique / Show Jumping	1984	No Man's Land
Les Conguerants		TRAN
Contract Bridge	1983	Alligata
Contre Attaque	1984	Proriciel
Cosmic Debris		Artic Computing
Cosmic Intruders	1983	Mercury Microware
Course aux Lettres / Cyprien	1984	Loriciels
Course Olympique	1985	A & F Software
Cribbage	1984	IJK Software
Crocky		Loriciels
Croqueur		Micro Programmes 5
Crypt Show	1985	Norsoft
Cubo Magique		Hatier
Dallas	1983	Strategy Games
Damae		Bleu Ciel Informatique
Dambuster	1984	IJK Software
Damsel in Distress	1985	IJK Software
Dangereusement Votre / A View to a Kill	1985	Domark / Eureka Informatique
Darts		W.E. Software
Death Driver		GPD Software
Death Satellite (Adventure 1)	1983	A & F Software
Death Trap		Headfield
Decrypt		Bleu Ciel Informatique
Dedal	1984	Infogrames
Defence Force	1983	Tansoft
Delta 4	1983	Emerald Software
Dernier Metro	1985	Micro Programmes 5
Des Jeux Votre Oric / 1		Shift Editions
Des Jeux Votre Oric / 2		Shift Editions
Des Jeux Votre Oric / 3		Shift Editions
Des Jeux Votre Oric -4		Shift Editions
Des Jeux Votre Oric -5		Shift Editions
Detective Story	1985	No Man's Land
Dexterite	1983	ASN Diffusion
The Diabolical Tower / La Tour Fantastique	1984	No Man's Land
Le Diamant de Kheops		Sprites
Le Diamant de l'Ile Maudite	1984	Loriciels
Dico 5	1983	Loriciels
Dig Dog	1983	Taskset
Digger	1983	Mercury Microware
Dinky Kong	1983	Seven Software
Diver		Godsoft
Doggy	1984	Loriciels
Don Juan	1984	No Man's Land
Don Juans et Dragueurs	1984	ERE Informatique
Don't Press the Letter Q	1984	IJK Software
Dossier G		Cobra Soft
Dracula	1983	Mr Micro
Dracula's Revenge / La Revanche de Dracula	1983	Softek
Draughts	1984	IJK Software
Drive Point		Sprites
Driver (Dialog)	1984	Dialog
Driver (Loriciels)		Loriciels
Dungeon Adventure	1983	Level 9 Computing
Durendal		Cobra Soft
Échecs	1983	ASN Diffusion
Echecs (Clovis-1)		Bleu Ciel Informatique
Edit Kong		Sprites
Elektro Storm	1983	PSS
En Route vers la Galaxie CE 2		Squirelle
Encounter	1983	Seven Software
Envahisseurs	1983	ASN Diffusion
Escape from Manhattan		CRL
Escape from Pulsar 7		Channel 8 Software
Esquive / Esquives	1983	ASN / Oric France
L'Ete sera chaud	1984	Sprites
Fantasy Quest	1983	IJK Software
Farmer Horace		Elephant Software
Feasibility Experiment	1983	Channel 8 Software
Fire Flash	1984	No Man's Land
Fishy Business		Salamander Software
Flight 401?	1984	Knightsoft
Flight Simulator		Quark Data
Flipper	1984	Loriciels
La Flute Inca	1984	Marco Polo
Fly For Your Life	1986	FGC
Football		FGC
Football Manager	1984	Addictive Games
Formule 1 (Cobra Soft)	1985	Cobra Soft
Formule 1 (Loriciels)	1983	Loriciels
Forth		ASN Diffusion
La France	1983	ASN Diffusion
Franklin's Tomb		Salamander Software
Frelon	1984	Loriciels
Frigate Commander	1984	IJK Software
Frog		ASN Diffusion
Frog Hop	1983	Tansoft
Frogee	1983	Dream Software
Galactic Defend		Headfield
Galaxians	1983	Softek
Galaxie	1984	Micro Programmes 5
Galaxion	1983	Loriciels
Galaxy 5	1983	Durell Software
Gambit		Bleu Ciel Informatique
Games Compendium	1983	Salamander Software
Games Pack 16K		Sector 7 Software
Games Pack 48K		Sector 7 Software
GamesTrio	1983	Express Software
Gastronon	1983	Loriciels
The Gauntlet		PSS
Le General	1984	Loriciels
Ghost Gobbler	1984	IJK Software
Ghostman	1984	Seven Software
Godill'Oric	1983	Loriciels
Goldmine		FGC
The Golden Baton		Channel 8 Software
Golf (Gemini Marketing)		Gemini Marketing Ltd.
Golf (Williams)		Williams
Grail	1983	Seven Software
Gravitor	1984	Seven Software
Green		Emerald Software
Green X Toad	1984	IJK Software
Grid Attack		Shards
Grid Bomb	1984	Touchstone
Gubbie	1985	IJK Software
Guerre des Couleurs	1983	ASN Diffusion
Gusto Blusto	1983	Dart Software
Hangman	1984	Mellowsoft
Hangman/ Match 2		Ciro Soft
Happy Landings	1983	Basic Concepts
The Hare and the Tortoise	1984	No Man's Land
Hare Raiser / Finale	1984	Haresoft
Hare Raiser / Prelude	1984	Haresoft
Harrier Attack	1983	Durell Software
The Hellion	1984	Orpheus
Hell's Temple	1983	Kenema
Hollywood Director	1987	GPD Software
Honey Kong		Sprites
Hop Frog + City Bomber	1983	Cosmos Computer Software
Hopper	1983	PSS
Horror Atoll		Add On
The House of Death	1984	Tansoft
Hu*Bert	1983	Loriciels
Hunchback	1983	Ocean
Hyper Master Mind	1983	Loriciels
Hyperspace 4	1984	Cobra Soft
Ice Giant / Le Géant Glacé	1983	Softek
Indiana Smith		FGC
Inferno		Cobra Soft
Intertron	1983	Loriciels
Intox et Zoe	1984	Loriciels
Invaders	1983	Program Factory
Invaders (Arcadia)	1983	Arcadia
Invaders (IJK)	1983	IJK Software
Invaders (PSS)	1983	PSS
Island of Death	1983	Ocean
Jack-Man / Jackman	1983	Loriciels
Jackpot		ASN Diffusion
Jasmin Games 32		UK Gold / Knightsoft
Jerico 2	1983	Elephant Software
Jeu du Pendu		ASN Diffusion
Jeux Olympiques		Micropuce
Jimmy Poubelle	1985	Loriciels
Jogger	1983	Seven Software
Johnny Reb	1983	MC Lothorien
Jumper		Elephant Software
Jungle Trouble		Durell Software
Juniper		Quark Data
Karate	1986	Gasoline Software
Kilburn Encounter	1983	Tansoft
Killer Caverns	1983	Virgin Games
Knights		Headfield
Krillys	1984	Orpheus
Krocatile Waltz		Superior Software
Lancelot	1984	Sprites
Land of Illusion		Tansoft
The Last Warrior		FGC
Le Fer d'Amnukor	1986	Norsoft
Le Minotaure		Hatier
Le Temple D'Enfer	1984	Kenema
Le Tour du Monde en 80 Jours / Around the World	1984	No Man's Land
Le Trident de Neptune	1984	No Man's Land
Le Yi King	1984	No Man's Land
League Champions		FGC
La Legende d'Astragorth	1983	Norsoft
Leopard Lord	1983	Kayde
Le Lievre et la Tortue	1983	Cobra Soft
Light Cycle	1983	PSS
Loch Ness Monsters	1984	Romik
Locus	1984	No Man's Land
Lode Runner		Oric
Loki	1983	Joe the Lion
Lone Raider		Seven Software
Lords of Time	1983	Level 9 Computing
Lost in Space	1983	Salamander Software
Lotoriciels	1984	Loriciels
Ludico	1987	Bleu Ciel Informatique
Lunar Lander / Asteroids	1983	Durell Software
Lunar Mission		Superior Software
M.A.R.C.	1984	PSS
Macadam Bumper	1985	ERE Informatique
Le Magot		Oric
Manic Miner	1985	Software Projects
Le Manoir du Docteur Genius	1983	Loriciels
Martian Rescue	1983	Magnum Software
Le Masque d'Or / The Golden Mask	1985	No Man's Land
Master Mynde		Headfield
Mastermind		Gemini Marketing Ltd.
Mastermind (Williams)		Williams
Match Couleur / Puissance 4	1983	Loriciels
Maze Eater		UTS
Maze Rally	1986	FGC
Méfies Toi de Mephisto	1987	Bleu Ciel Informatique
Memo Strip	1984	Micropuce
Memoric	1983	ASN Diffusion
Memory Map		Byteland
Merchant Prince		Ciro Soft
Metho-Loto		Oric
Meurtre a Grande Vitesse	1984	Cobra Soft
Meutres sur l'Atlantique		Cobra Soft
Microgeo	1985	Microfutur
Microsapiens		ERE Informatique
Millionnaire (Le / The Millionaire)	1984	ERE Informatique
Mind 6		Touchstone
Mined Out	1984	Quicksilva
Miner (Computasolve)	1983	Computasolve
Miner (Strategy Games)		Strategy Games
Mines of Saturn / Return to Earth	1983	Mikrogen
Minos	1983	ASN Diffusion
Mission Delta	1984	ERE Informatique
Mission Impossible (Free Game Blot)		Free Game Blot
Mission Impossible (Micropuce)	1984	Micropuce
Mission Impossible (No Man's Land)	1984	No Man's Land
Mona Lisa		Dart Software
Monopolic	1983	Free Game Blot
Monte Carlo Rally	1983	Express Software
Montsegur	1985	Norsoft
Moon Buggy		PC Mikrodata
Moonster		Quark Data
Moria	1983	Seven Software
Morpion	1983	ASN Diffusion
Morpion 3D	1983	Micropuce
Morts Subites	1983	ASN Diffusion
Mots Croises	1985	Cobra Soft
Mr President	1986	GPD Software
Mr Wimpy	1984	Ocean
Multigames (BASIC)		Intelligent Software
Multigames (M/C)		Intelligent Software
Multigames 1	1983	Tansoft
Multigames 2	1983	Tansoft
Mur de Briques		ASN Diffusion
Mushroom Mania	1983	Arcadia
Mutant Invaders		R & R
Le Mystère de Kikekankoi		Loriciels
Mystery Towers		Quark Data
Nessy (Cobra Soft)		Cobra Soft
Nessy (Free Game Blot)		Free Game Blot
Night Fight	1983	ASN Diffusion
Nightrider		Ciro Soft
Nowotnik Puzzle	1984	Tansoft
Objectif Elysee	1984	ERE Informatique
Oenol Oric		Cobra Soft
Operation Gremlin	1983	Wintersoft
Ordidactic	1984	SVM
Orible	1983	Loriciels
Oric Adventure		Tevward Microtech
Oric Defender / Ferry	1983	Magnum Software
Oric Flight	1983	Tansoft
Oric Games Pack		Shards
Oric Golf	1983	R & R
Oric Invaders		Oricsoft
Oric Mind	1983	ASN Diffusion
Oric Munch	1983	Tansoft
Oric Parchen Kirchen		Oric Dan
Oric Phone		ASN Diffusion
Oric Trek	1983	Salamander Software
Oric Worm	1983	PASE
Orical Backgammon	1983	Dormere
Orical Invaders	1983	Dormere
Orical Noughts and Crosses	1983	Dormere
Oricle		Quark Data
OricStar		Durell Software
Orion	1983	Loriciels
Orthocrack 1	1984	Hatier
Orthocrack 2	1984	Hatier
Orthocrack 3	1984	Hatier
Othello (ASN)	1983	ASN Diffusion
Othello (Kenema)		Kenema
Othello (TRAN)		TRAN
Ovni	1983	Loriciels
Painter	1983	Free Game Blot
Panic	1984	No Man's Land
Parachuter/ Fruit		Ciro Soft
Paragram		Elephant Software
Paras	1983	MC Lothorien
Pasta Blasta	1983	Arcadia
Pengoric	1983	Loriciels
Perseus & Andromeda		Channel 8 Software
Picture Snap	1983	Mellowsoft
Pieton		Enterprise Informatique
Pinball		Loriciels
The Pits	1983	Touchstone
Planète Bleue		Cobra Soft
Playground 21	1985	IJK Software
Poker (ASN)		ASN Diffusion
Poker (Loriciels)	1983	Loriciels
Pole Position		IJK Software
Pontoon / Cribbage		IMS Software
Pontoon / Horse Race		Williams
Poopy	1984	Micrologic
Postman Sam		Mellowsoft
Probe 3	1983	IJK Software
Projectiles / Bandit	1983	Loriciels
Le Protector	1983	Loriciels
Psychiatric	1984	Sprites
Psycho 2	1983	L.A. Software
Psycho 3	1983	L.A. Software
Puissance 4 / Mur de Brique	1983	ASN Diffusion
Quack a Jack	1984	Seven Software
Quadri		Bleu Ciel Informatique
Quark 3D Invaders		Quark Data
Quest	1983	Tansoft
Quizmaster Rock and Pop	1983	R & R
Quizmaster Sports And Games		R & R
Rabbit	1985	Norsoft
Racing		Peach
Rainbow Warrior	1985	Oricsoft
Rat Splat	1983	Tansoft
Rats		Cascade
Le Rebelle		TRAN
Le rendez-vous de la terreur	1984	ERE Informatique
Rescue	1984	CRL
Le Retour du Docteur Genius	1984	Loriciels
Return to Atlantis		A & F Software
Reverse	1983	IJK Software
Reversi (CDS)	1983	CDS Micro Systems
Reversi (Tansoft)	1983	Tansoft
Reversi Challenger		Cobra Soft
Reversi Champion	1984	Loriciels
Rig Runner		Tansoft
The Ring of Darkness	1983	Wintersoft
Ringo	1983	Elephant Software
Road Frog	1983	Ocean
Rock'n' Roll	1986	GPD Software
Roland Garros	1985	Sprites
Roundsby Incident		Add On
Route Rider		Byteland
Royaume		Salamander Software
Runelord	1983	M.C.P
S.A.G.A	1985	ERE Informatique
SAS	1983	Touchstone
Le Sceptre d'Anubis	1984	Micro Programmes 5
Schtroumpfs	1984	Micro 7
Scorbutt	1984	Micro Programmes 5
Scrabble (Knightsoft)		UK Gold / Knightsoft
Scrabble (W.E. Software)		W.E. Software
Scuba Dive	1983	Durell Software
Sea Battle Ward	1984	Vismo
Le Secret de Kaipur	1984	France Logiciel
Le Secret du Tombeau	1985	Loriciels
Simulateur		ASN Diffusion
Skramble	1983	Microdeal
Snake Venom		FGC
Snaky		Sprites
Snowball	1983	Level 9 Computing
Soccer Manager	1984	Knightsoft
Solitaire	1983	Vismo
The Sorcerer		Cosmos Computer Software
Sorvivor/Survivor	1984	Loriciels
Space Crystal		Quark Data
Space Invaders (Diand Software)	1983	Diand Software
Space Invaders (R & R)		R & R
Space Mission		CRL
Space Quest	1983	Express Software
Space Shuttle	1983	Microdeal
Space Trader	1983	Magnum Software
Spacewall		Microfutur
Special Operations	1983	MC Lothlorien
Spider's Revenge		Dart Software
Spooky Mansion	1984	Mercury Microware
Stanley	1984	Loriciels
Star (ERE)		ERE Informatique
Star (Loriciels)	1985	Loriciels
Star Bingo		R & R
Star Fighter	1983	Durell Software
Star War	1983	Vismo
Starprobe		Chymesoft
Starship		Sector 7 Software
Starship to Hell		Chymesoft
Starter 3D	1984	Landscape
Startreker		W.E. Software
Starwind		FGC
Stock Market		A.S.Press Software
Stockmarket		Compusoft
Stress		Cobra Soft
Strip 21	1983	Micropuce
Styx	1984	No Man's Land
Sub Hunt	1983	Magnum Software
Sub-Killer	1983	Ciro Soft
Sultans Maze		Gemini Marketing Ltd.
Super Advanced Breakout	1983	Tansoft
Super Fruit		Quark Data
Super Jeep	1984	Loriciels
Super Meteors (Les)	1983	Softek
Superfruit	1984	IJK Software
Supermaze		A & F Software
Superslug		Oricsoft
The Swamp		Kayde
Talisman		Infogrames
Teknis	1986	Gasoline Software
Tele-Chess		Oric
Tele-Kube		Oric
Telematic		Oric
Le Temple Maudit		Sprites
Ten Little Indians		Channel 8 Software
Tendre Poulet	1984	Sprites
Terminus	1984	ERE Informatique
Terreur		ERE Informatique
Terror From The Deep		Add On
Tevrog's Kingdom	1983	Tevward Microtech
Tevrogs Kingdom II / Quest for Power	1983	Cable
The Boss		Peaksoft
The Clone		Mercury Microware
The Hobbit	1983	Melbourne House
The Old House in Greenstoke		Dart Software
The Raider	1986	Tagada Soft
The Valley	1983	A.S.Press Software
Them: A Paranoid Fantasy	1984	Virgin Games
Thunderbound		Godsoft
Tic Tac	1984	Loriciels
Tie-Break		Sprites
Time Machine		Channel 8 Software
Timebomb		Oricsoft
Tir	1983	Vismo
Tirailler		Micro 7
Titan	1984	Infogrames
Toady		Headfield
Tracer Racer	1983	PASE
Transat One (FR and UK versions)	1984	No Man's Land
Treasure House		Program Factory
Le Trèfle Polaire		Cobra Soft
Le Tresor de Tarakunda	1984	Micro Programmes 5
Le Trésor du Pirate	1984	Free Game Blot
Triathlon	1985	ERE Informatique
Trickshot	1984	IJK Software
Tri-Olymporic	1984	Besdugiciel
Trouble in Store	1984	Orpheus
Two Gun Turtle	1983	MC Lothorien
Tyrann	1984	Norsoft
Tyrant	1987	Your Oric
Ultima Zone	1983	Tansoft
The Ultra	1983	PSS
Une Affaire en Or	1984	Free Game Blot
Uranium		ARD
The Valley	1983	Kayde
Vanquisher	1983	Elephant Software
Velnor's Lair	1984	Quicksilva
Vicky le Jardinier		Cobra Soft
Vision	1984	Loriciels
Vol Oric	1983	ASN Diffusion
Warlord	1983	MC Lothorien
Warship!	1984	W.E. Software
Water Panic	1984	Micrologic
Waxworks		Channel 8 Software
Waydor		IMS Software
West Quest		PASE
The White Barrows	1983	A.S.Press Software
Willy	1987	Oric
Winter Games		FGC
Wizard of Akryz		Channel 8 Software
Wizard of Oric		Micro Programmes 5
Wordsearch	1984	CDS Micro Systems
World War III	1983	Free Game Blot
The World		Headfield
Wormy	1984	Hatier
Xenon	1983	Microdeal
Xenon 1	1983	IJK Software
Xenon III	1985	IJK Software
YAM	1983	ASN Diffusion
Zebbie	1984	IJK Software
Zig Zag	1983	ASN Diffusion
Zodiac	1983	Tansoft
Zodiac Adventure	1983	A & F Software
Zoolympics	1984	No Man's Land
Zorgon's Revenge	1983	IJK Software

== Clones ==
The Atmos was licensed in Yugoslavia and sold as Nova 64. The clones were Atmos-based, the only difference being the logo indicating ORIC NOVA 64 instead of Oric Atmos 48K. This is to indicate the installed 64 KB of RAM – which was also true of the Atmos –, 16 KB of which is masked in both by the ROM at startup, leaving 48 KB to work with the BASIC language.

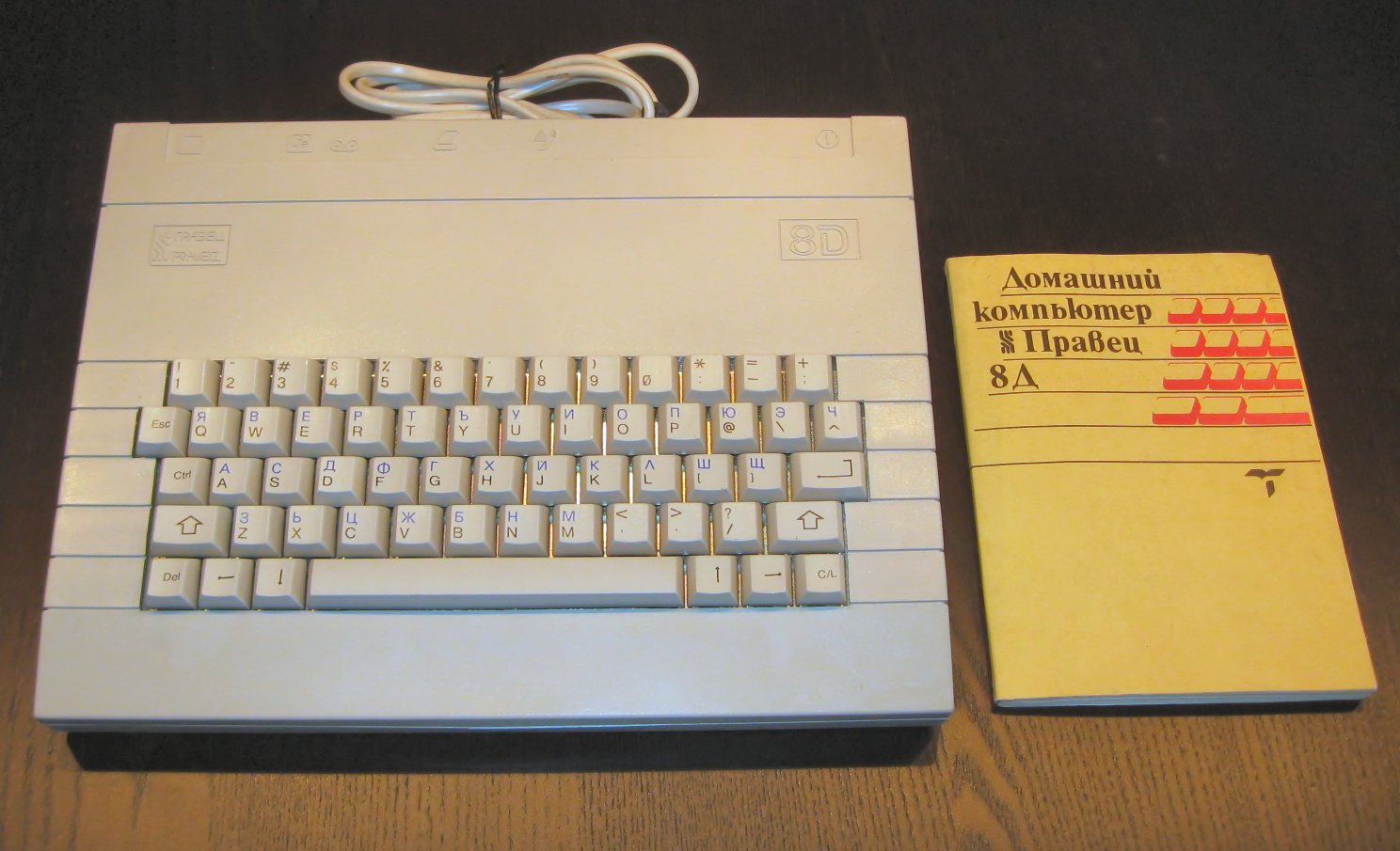
Pravetz 8D

In Bulgaria, the Atmos clone was named Pravetz 8D and produced between 1985 and 1991. The Pravetz is entirely hardware and software compatible with the Oric Atmos. The biggest change on the hardware side is the larger white case that hosts a comfortable mechanical keyboard and an integrated power supply. The BASIC ROM has been patched to host both a Latin and Cyrillic alphabet – the upper case character set produces Western European characters, while lower case gives Cyrillic letters. In order to ease the use of the two alphabets, the Pravetz 8D is fitted with a Caps Lock key. A Disk II compatible interface and a custom DOS, called DOS-8D, were created in 1987–88 by Borislav Zahariev.

== See also ==
- Category:Oric games
