= Tangerine Computer Systems =

British home-computer company

- Industry: Computing; Electronics
- Founded: 1979; United Kingdom
- Headquarters: United Kingdom
- Products: TAN1648 VDU, Tangerine Microtan 65, Oric

Tangerine Computer Systems was a British microcomputer company founded in 1979 by Dr. Paul Johnson, Mark Rainer and Nigel Penton Tilbury in St. Ives, Cambridgeshire.

The very first product was the successful TAN1648 VDU kit which received much acclaim in the technical press.

The home computer market was beginning to move, albeit slowly, and it was essential to establish a presence. Development and expansion was imperative. It was decided that the latter two partners would relinquish their involvement in order to focus on their consultancy work.

Barry Muncaster became involved operationally and the company moved to new premises in Ely, Cambridgeshire. The company was later renamed, and was known as Oric Products International.

== Early years: Microtan 65 ==
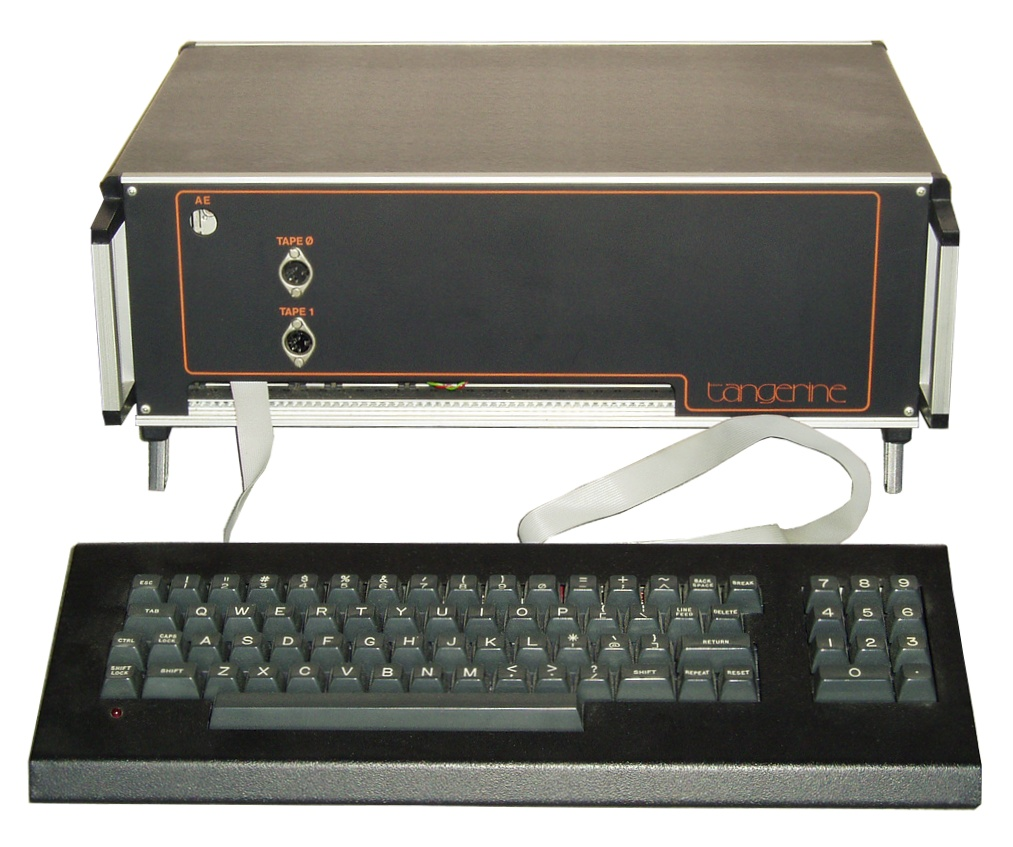
The Microtan 65 in the full System Rack enclosure and with the ASCII keyboard

Tangerine produced one of the first 6502-based kit computers, the Microtan 65. It had a 3U form factor, a small amount of memory (RAM), a video character generator and UHF modulator for use with a TV set, and a simple latch for entering hex data from a keypad, and the computer was designed to be expandable. The manual came with a one-kilobyte listing of Conway's Game of Life. An optional expansion board could be built with a UART, more memory and BASIC ROMs. Additional expansion boards became available later, offering more RAM, dedicated serial and parallel I/O boards, etc.

After the Microtan 65, Tangerine planned to build a desktop machine and managed to get as far as selling the design for the Microtan 2, also known as Tangerine Tiger, to HH Electronics, better known for building amplifiers. They released it as the HH Tiger, but it was not a commercial success.

== Tantel ==
Several Prestel machines were sold, under the general designation of Tantel:

- AlphaTantel (1981) – Prestel adapter with a full keyboard and a phone connection jack. Connection to a TV was through a RF modulator, but there was also a RGB output. Built in modem was 1200 baud. It was possible to connect a tape recorder to save data and a printer.
- New Tantel Adaptor (1981) – Prestel adapter
- Tantel Data Adaptor (1984) – Data adaptor for use with the Prestel system, including a data tape recorder

== 1983 onwards: The Oric family ==
With the success of the ZX Spectrum Tangerine's backers suggested a home computer and Tangerine formed Oric Products International Ltd to develop and release the Oric-1 in 1983. A series of Oric computers (including the Oric Atmos) followed through to 1987.

On 13 October 1983 the factory of Kenure Plastics in Berkshire, where the Oric-1 was manufactured, suffered a fire causing "several thousand pounds worth of damage", in which around 7,000 Oric machines were destroyed. The factory was rebuilt, minus a considerable stock of bits (including 15,000 old ROMs) that went to make up the Oric-1. In the meantime production was said to have restarted within 24 hours in a new factory. Just a day later, a neighbouring warehouse went up in flames. Police were said at the time to suspect that the arsonist got the wrong place first time round. It was about this time, too, that Tansoft moved to co-exist with Oric Research at the Techno Park, Cambridge.

About 160,000 Oric-1s were sold in the UK in 1983 with another 50,000 sold in France (where it was the top-selling machine that year). Although not the 350,000 predicted, it was enough for Oric International to be bought out by Edenspring and given £4m in funding. This enabled the release of the Oric Atmos, an improved successor to the Oric-1 which added a true keyboard and improved ROM.

Although the Atmos failed to turn around Oric's fortunes, in early 1985 they announced several forthcoming models, including an IBM-compatible and an MSX-compatible. On 1 February they demonstrated the Oric Stratos/IQ164 at the Frankfurt Computer Show; on the 2nd however, Edenspring put Oric International into receivership with Tansoft, by then a company in its own right, following in May.

French company Eureka bought the remains of Oric and, after renaming itself, continued to produce the Stratos under that name, followed by the Oric Telestrat in late 1986.

In December 1987 after announcing the Telestrat 2, Oric International went into receivership for the second and final time.
