= HH Audio =

British amplifier manufacturer

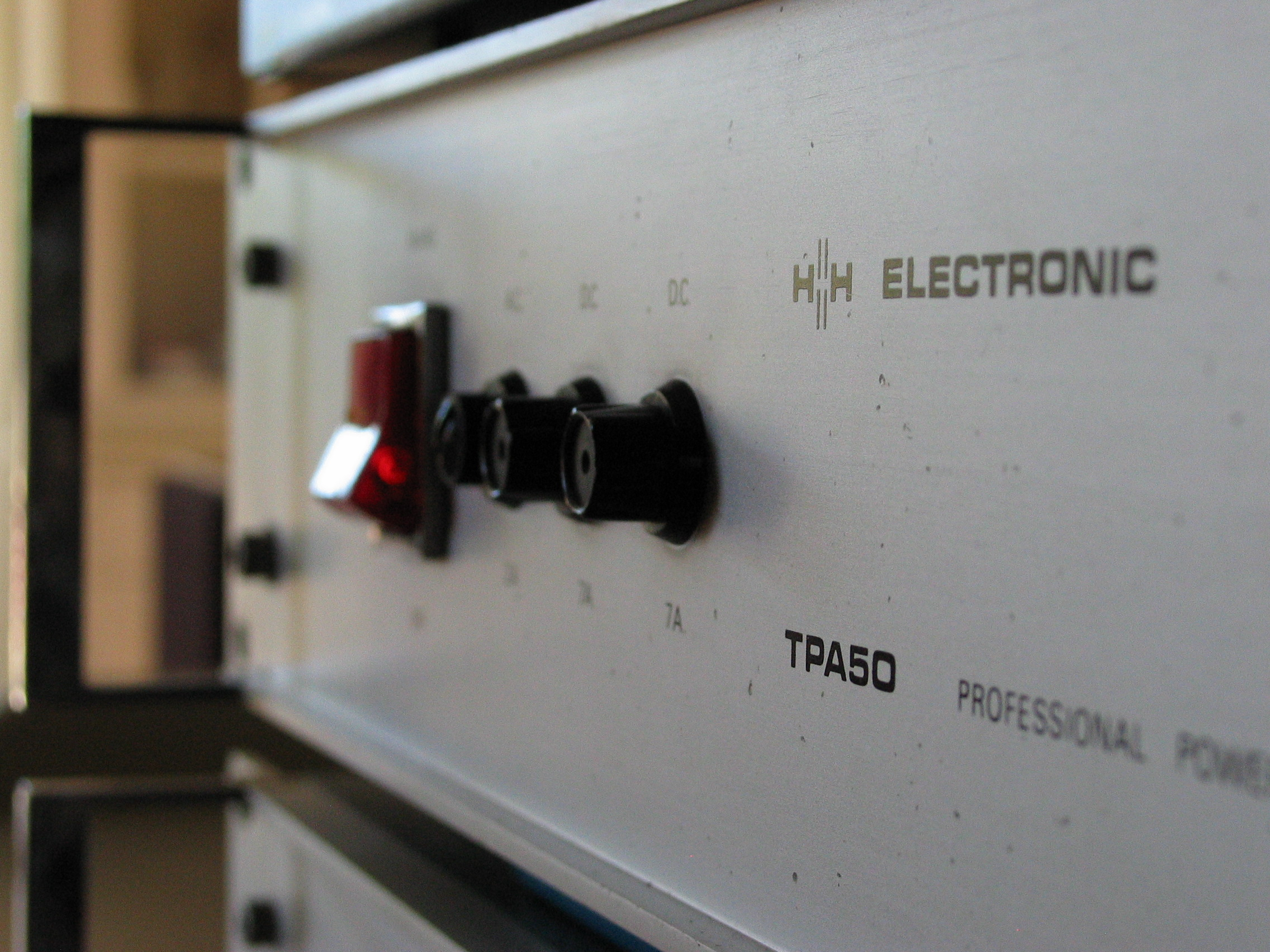
HH Electronic TPA50 Professional Power Amplifier - front panel

HH Audio (formerly HH Electronic and HH Electronics) is a British amplifier manufacturer that was founded in 1968 by Mike Harrison near Cambridge, England. The company moved to Milton, Cambridgeshire, in 1969, and had built a factory in nearby Bar Hill by 1977. By 1979, they had achieved success in Europe with a range of instrument amplifiers, and their public address products included mixers, power amplifiers, speaker systems and digital effects units.

The company entered receivership in 1984, and the brand passed to Carlsbro. Mike Harrison continued to design amplifiers as Harrison Information Technology. By 1989, the HH brand was owned by the Headstock Group, owners of Laney Amplification. Headstock revived the brand in 2012, launching a new line of sound reinforcement equipment.

== Amplifiers ==
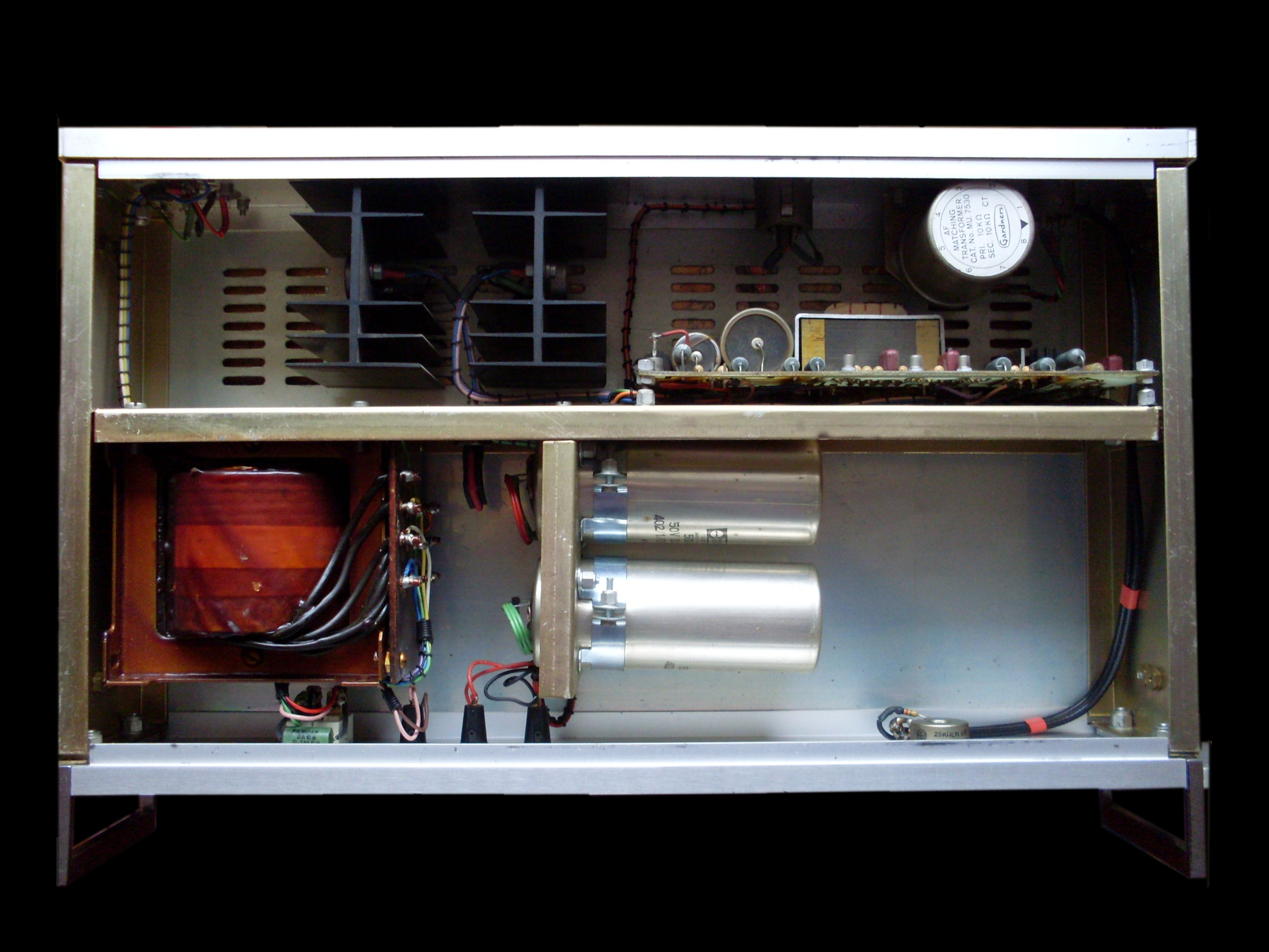
HH Electronic TPA50 Professional Power Amplifier

HH was initially known as a manufacturer of audio amplifiers, and found early success with solid state power amplifier designs. Its first solid state studio-quality amplifiers, such as the TPA50, were used by many recording and broadcasting studios, including Apple Records, LWT's Intersound Recording Studios and the BBC (for whom HH built the AM8/12 studio monitor amplifier).

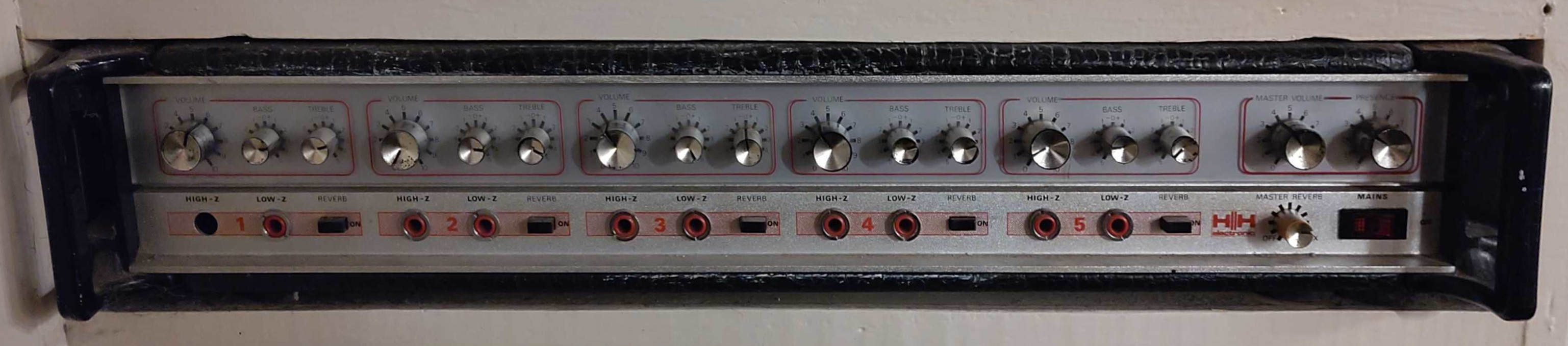
HH Electronic MA100 mixer amplifier

The early 1970s saw HH's first power amplifiers using integrated circuits. The IC-based TPA D range was introduced as a successor to the TPA series, including the TPA25D, TPA50D and TPA100D. For PA applications, the IC100 power amplifier and MA100 mixer amplifier, both delivering up to 100 watts, were available in the UK and Europe by late 1972. The MA100 offered five input channels with bass and treble EQ, and built-in reverb; the MA100S was a lower-cost version without reverb. The IC100 introduced the striking electroluminescent panel lighting used on HH's instrument amplifiers through the late 1970s, with the company changing to more conventional panel designs in the 1980s.

HH Electronic V-S Musician guitar amplifier

The IC100 was also available for musical instrument use in a "combination" version built into a cabinet with two speakers. In 1977, HH introduced the V-S Musician guitar amplifier, based on the IC100 series. It had two input channels, one of which featured four-band EQ, three EQ presets, and a "Valve Sound" overdrive using a combination of transistor distortion and filters, with spring reverb. Reviewing the V-S Musician in Fachblatt MusicMagazin, Gerald Dellmann said that he had "never heard a transistor amp that could produce such a warm distorted tone". A bass version, the V-S Bassamp, was also available, and both could be purchased as standalone units or mounted in a combo cabinet.

HH's final generation of amplifiers, the V series introduced in 1979, were based on MOSFET technology, allowing higher output powers with low distortion, and incorporating more sophisticated cooling and output protection features. A 1982 US review of the HH V800 described it as "a superbly-crafted piece of equipment—utterly reliable and virtually indestructible".

== Other products ==
HH introduced an electronic piano, the P73, in 1981. The P73 offered five piano and clavichord voices, and was controlled by a microprocessor. The P73 was used by keyboardist Duncan Mackay.

In late 1983, HH launched the Tiger microcomputer, the design of which had been acquired from Tangerine Computer Systems, featuring a Zilog Z80 processor equipped with 64 KB of RAM for running the CP/M operating system, a Motorola 6809 processor with 2 KB of RAM for input/output control, and a NEC 7220 video controller with 96 KB of RAM supporting 80-column, 40-column and videotex-style text modes along with an 8-colour 512 x 512 graphics mode. The machine was equipped with a modem for access to Prestel and other online services. As was common with microcomputers of the era, the core functionality was situated in the keyboard unit, with a separate unit combining a 14-inch colour display and dual floppy disk drives. The base system was priced at £2,795.
