= Michael Guy =

British mathematician and computer scientist

Michael J. T. Guy
- Born: 1 April 1943 (age 83)
- Citizenship: United Kingdom
- Known for: ALGOL 68C
- Scientific career
- Fields: Computer science, mathematics
- Workplaces: University of Cambridge
- Academic advisors: J. W. S. Cassels

Michael J. T. Guy (born 1 April 1943) is a British computer scientist and mathematician. He is known for early work on computer systems, such as the Phoenix system at the University of Cambridge, and for contributions to number theory, computer algebra, and the theory of polyhedra in higher dimensions. He worked closely with John Horton Conway, and is the son of Conway's collaborator Richard K. Guy.

== Mathematical work ==
With Conway, Guy found the complete solution to the Soma cube of Piet Hein. Also with Conway, an enumeration led to the discovery of the grand antiprism, an unusual uniform polychoron in four dimensions. The two had met at Gonville and Caius College, Cambridge, where Guy was an undergraduate student from 1960, and Conway was a graduate student. It was through Michael that Conway met Richard Guy, who would become a co-author of works in combinatorial game theory. Michael Guy with Conway made numerous particular contributions to geometry, number and game theory, often published in problem selections by Richard Guy. Some of these are recreational mathematics, others contributions to discrete mathematics. They also worked on the sporadic groups.

Guy began work as a research student of J. W. S. Cassels at Department of Pure Mathematics and Mathematical Statistics (DPMMS), Cambridge. He did not complete a Ph.D., but joint work with Cassels produced numerical examples on the Hasse principle for cubic surfaces.

== Computer science ==
He subsequently went into computer science. He worked on the filing system for Titan, Cambridge's Atlas 2, being one of a team of four in one office including Roger Needham. In working on ALGOL 68, he was co-author with Stephen R. Bourne of ALGOL 68C.

== Bibliography ==
- Conway, J.H.; Guy, M. J. T. (1965). "Four-Dimensional Archimedean Polytopes". Proceedings of the Colloquium on Convexity at Copenhagen. pp. 38–39.
- Conway, J.H.; Croft, H.T.; Erdos, P.; Guy, M. J. T. (1979). "On the Distribution of Values of Angles Determined by Coplanar Points". Journal of the London Mathematical Society. II (19): 137–143. doi:10.1112/jlms/s2-19.1.137.
- Bremner, Andrew (Tempe, AZ); Goggins, Joseph R. (Girvan); Guy, Michael J. T. (Cambridge); Guy, Richard K. (Calgary, Alta) (2000). "On rational Morley triangles" (PDF). Acta Arithmetica. XCIII (2).

== Notes ==
- Conway, John H.; Burgiel, Heidi; Goodman-Strauss, Chaim (2008). The Symmetries of Things. Natick, Massachusetts – Boca Raton, Florida: A K Peters – CRC Press. p. 217. ISBN 978-1-5688-1220-5.
