= Sup'R'Mod =

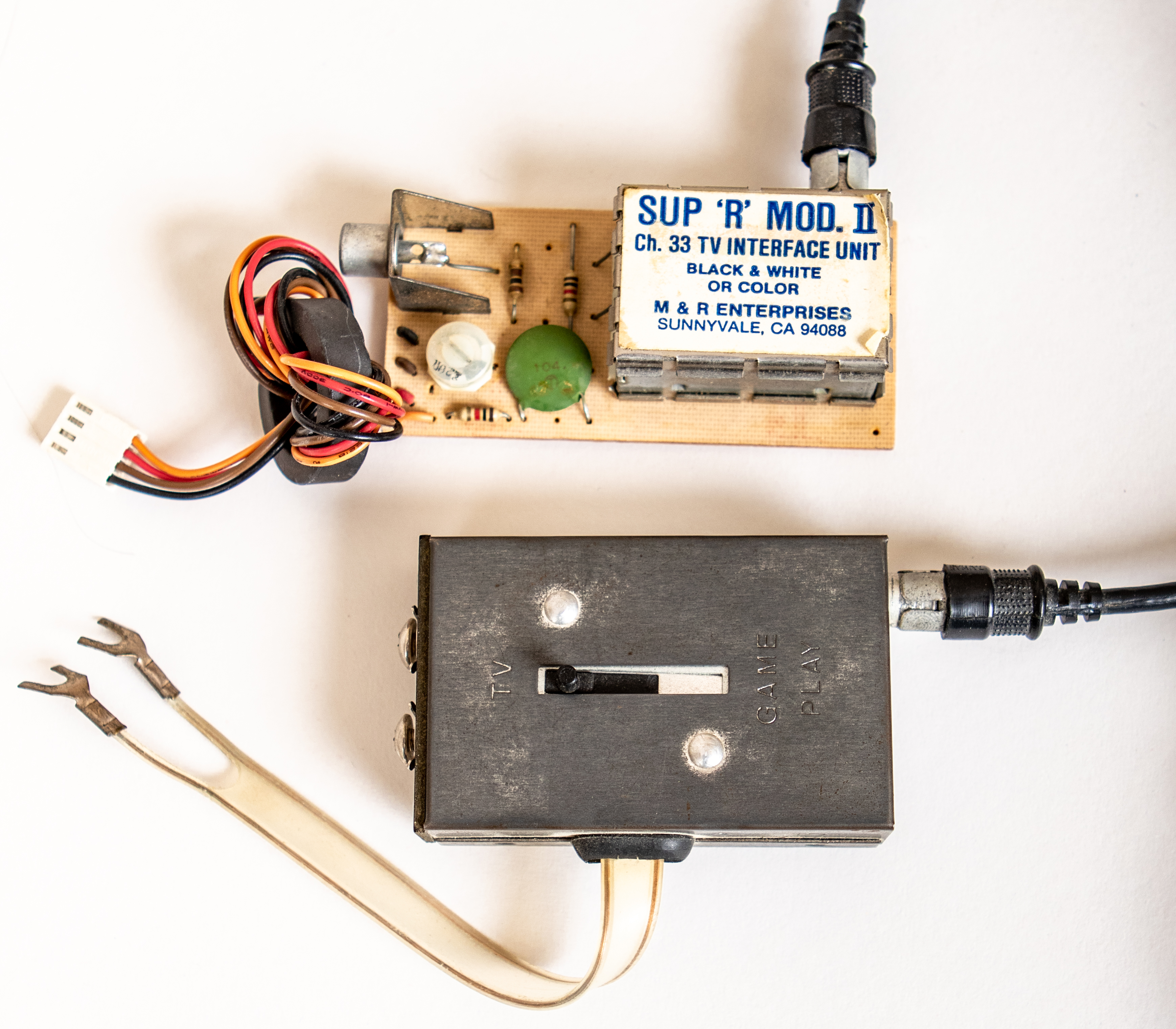
Modulator and antenna switch

The Sup 'R' Mod II is an RF modulator which was sold by M&R Enterprises in the late 1970s and early 1980s. It connects computers and other devices with composite video outputs, to a television.

== History ==
Apple Computer wanted to provide Apple II computers with color output on a television, but had trouble getting FCC approval because the RF modulation solution is too noisy. Apple made an arrangement with a small nearby company, M&R Enterprises, to manufacture and sell the devices. Apple could not sell the modulator and computer as a package, but retail computer dealers could sell both devices to the end user.

Marty Spergel, who ran M&R Enterprises, was told by Steve Jobs that it might sell up to 50 units a month. Spergel later estimated that he had sold about 400,000 units.

The Sup 'R' Mod II began selling in April 1978, for US$29.95 (equivalent to about $100 in 2024).

== Technical features ==
The Sup 'R' Mod II kit has a small printed circuit board, an antenna switch, and a coaxial cable with a ferrite core and RCA connectors. Composite video is received by the circuit board through a short cable terminating in a Molex connector, which plugs into a header on the Apple II motherboard. Input can also be provided through an RCA connector. The output of the RF modulator goes out through a coaxial cable to the antenna switch.

The antenna switch allows the user to select between television broadcasts and computer output. The television antenna connects to inputs on the switch, and the switch output connects to the back of the television. The connections use screw terminals with spade lugs. Moving the switch from "TV" to "GAME PLAY" selects the computer output.

The modulator presents a color signal on UHF channel 33.
