= The Unix System =

1982 book by Stephen R. Bourne

- Author: Stephen R. Bourne
- Publication date: 1982

The Unix System (ISBN 0-201-13791-7, ISBN 978-0201137910) is a book by Stephen R. Bourne. Published in 1982, it was the first widely available general introduction to the Unix operating system. It included some historical material on Unix, as well as material on using the system, editing, the software tools concept, C programming using the Unix API, data management with the shell and awk, and typesetting with troff.

A second edition, The Unix System V Environment, updated for UNIX System V, was released in 1987.
