= ALGOL 68C =

Imperative computer programming language

ALGOL 68 Cambridge
- Developers: Stephen Bourne, Michael Guy, Andrew D. Birrell, Ian Walker, Chris Cheney, et al.
- Release: circa 1970; 56 years ago
- Stable release: 1.3039 / March 3, 2013; 13 years ago
- Written in: ALGOL 68
- Operating system: IBM 360, 370, etc., mainframes (or emulations) running MVT or MVS
- Type: Compiler, translator
- Website: bitbucket.org/algol68c/dl

ALGOL 68C is an imperative computer programming language, a dialect of ALGOL 68, that was developed by Stephen R. Bourne and Michael Guy to program the Cambridge Algebra System (CAMAL). The initial compiler was written in the Princeton Syntax Compiler (PSYCO, by Edgar T. Irons) that was implemented by J. H. Mathewman at Cambridge.

ALGOL 68C was later used for the CHAOS OS for the capability-based security CAP computer at University of Cambridge in 1971. Other early contributors were Andrew D. Birrell and Ian Walker.

Subsequent work was done on the compiler after Bourne left Cambridge University in 1975. Garbage collection was added, and the code base is still running on an emulated OS/MVT using Hercules.

The ALGOL 68C compiler generated output in ZCODE, a register-based intermediate language, which could then be either interpreted or compiled to a native executable. This ability to interpret or compile ZCODE encouraged the porting of ALGOL 68C to many different computing platforms. Aside from the CAP computer, the compiler was ported to systems including Conversational Monitor System (CMS), TOPS-10, and Zilog Z80.

== ALGOL 68C extensions to ALGOL 68 ==
Below is a sampling of some notable extensions:

- Automatic op:= for any operator, e.g. *:= and +:=
- UPTO, DOWNTO and UNTIL in loop-clauses;
- displacement operator (:=:=)
- ANDF, ORF and THEF syntactic elements.
- separate compilation - ENVIRON clause and USING clause
- scopes not checked
- bounds in formal-declarers
- CODE ... EDOC clause - for embedding ZCODE

=== The ENVIRON and USING clauses ===
Separate compilation in ALGOL 68C is done using the ENVIRON and USING clauses. The ENVIRON saves the complete environment at the point it appears. A separate module written starting with a USING clause is effectively inserted into the first module at the point the ENVIRON clause appears.

ENVIRON and USING are useful for a top-down style of programming, in contrast to the bottom-up style implied by traditional library mechanisms.

These clauses are kind of the inverse of the #include found in the C programming language, or import found in Python. The purpose of the ENVIRON mechanism is to allow a program source to be broken into manageable sized pieces. It is only necessary to parse the shared source file once, unlike a #include found in the C programming language where the include file needs to be parsed for each source file that includes it.

==== Example of ENVIRON clause ====
A file called mylib.a68:

BEGIN
   INT dim = 3; # a constant #
   INT a number := 120; # a variable #
   ENVIRON EXAMPLE1;
   MODE MATRIX = [dim, dim]REAL; # a type definition #
   MATRIX m1;
   a number := ENVIRON EXAMPLE2;
   print((a number))
END

==== Example of USING clause ====
A file called usemylib.a68:

USING EXAMPLE2 FROM "mylib"
BEGIN
  MATRIX m2; # example only #
  print((a number)); # declared in mylib.a68 #
  print((2 UPB m1)); # also declared in mylib.a68 #
  ENVIRON EXAMPLE3;  # ENVIRONs can be nested #
  666
END

== Restrictions to the language from the standard ALGOL 68 ==
- No ALGOL 68 FLEX and variable length arrays
- MODE STRING implemented without FLEX
- The PAR parallel clause was not implemented
- Nonstandard transput
- others...

A translator–compiler for ALGOL 68C was available for the PDP-10, IBM System/360 and several other computers.

== Popular culture ==
A very early predecessor of this compiler was used by Guy and Bourne to write the first Game of Life programs on the PDP-7 with a DEC 340 display.

Various Liverpool Software Gazette issues detail the Z80 implementation. The compiler required about 120 KB of memory to run; hence the Z80's 64 KB memory is actually too small to run the compiler. So ALGOL 68C programs for the Z80 had to be cross-compiled from the larger CAP computer, or an IBM System/370 mainframe computer.

== Algol 68C and Unix ==
Stephen Bourne subsequently reused ALGOL 68's if ~ then ~ else ~ fi, case ~ in ~ out ~ esac and for ~ while ~ do ~ od clauses in the common Unix Bourne shell, but with in's syntax changed, out removed, and od replaced with done (to avoid conflict with the od utility).

After Cambridge, Bourne spent nine years at Bell Labs with the Version 7 Unix (Seventh Edition Unix) team. As well as developing the Bourne shell, he ported ALGOL 68C to Unix on the DEC PDP-11-45 and included a special option in his Unix debugger Advanced Debugger (adb) to obtain a stack backtrace for programs written in ALGOL 68C. Here is an extract from the Unix 7th edition manual pages:

NAME
      adb - debugger
SYNOPSIS
      adb [-w] [ objfil [ corfil ] ]
[...]
COMMANDS
[...]
       $modifier
             Miscellaneous  commands.   The  available modifiers
             are:
             [...]
             a      ALGOL 68 stack  backtrace.   If  address  is
                    given  then it is taken to be the address of
                    the current frame (instead of r4).  If count
                    is  given  then  only the first count frames
                    are printed.
