= Cambridge Algebra System =

Computer algebra system

- Developer(s): David Barton, Stephen R. Bourne, and John Fitch
- Written in: Titan assembler, ALGOL 68C, BCPL
- Operating system: Titan computer then Cross-platform
- Type: Computer algebra system

Cambridge Algebra System (CAMAL) is a computer algebra system written in Cambridge University by David Barton, Steve Bourne, and John Fitch. It was initially used for computations in celestial mechanics and general relativity. The foundation code was written in Titan computer assembler. In 1973, when Titan was replaced with an IBM System/370 Model 165, it was rewritten in ALGOL 68C and then BCPL where it could run on IBM mainframes and assorted microcomputers.
