= Liverpool Software Gazette =

- Liverpool Software Gazette - First Edition - November 1979
- Publisher: Microdigital
- First issue: November 1979
- Final issue Number: February 1981; 8

Liverpool Software Gazette was a short-lived computer magazine published by Microdigital Ltd, a company who were based in Liverpool, England and run by Bruce Everiss.

== History ==
The magazine was in print for only eight issues of which the last was a double issue. Issues were bi-monthly from November 1979 to February 1981 though the last was actually dated February/April 1981. Initially costing 50p, the price increased to 75p by the fifth edition while the final double edition cost £1.50. The page count started at around 50 though by the fifth edition had reached 100 pages.

The pressure of running both Microdigital and the magazine soon took its toll on the company, and the magazine was put up for sale during the final edition. It was sold to and incorporated into an Apple magazine where all non-Apple content was immediately dropped.

The magazine was intended for an audience of sophisticated and experienced computer users and tackled a wide range of subjects from languages, machine code and CPUs, systems (both large and small), games, programming techniques, astronomy. In many cases the articles went far deeper than those normally tackled by the computer magazines of the day.

== Content ==
There were some regular columns such as Pets Corner (for the Commodore PET), Apple Pips (for the Apple II), Nascom Notes and Nybbles (small BASIC tips and routines).

Below are some of the contents from each of the issues. Note the general term for computers back then was Microcomputers (sometimes spelt as two words). In some cases the original spelling/typos have been left intact.

Issue 1:

- Sargon meets the Nascom
- Programming Practices and Technics
- M5 System - an Interpreter for the Nascom One
- I'm Pilot, fly me
- Acorn Mastermind
- Pascal bytes the Apple

Issue 2:

- Dungeons & Dragons Revisited
- Numerical Accuracy of Microcomputers
- Cesil - an introduction
- Acorn and the Kim
- Z-80 Processor Profile
- Revas & Zeap
- Application Software for Microcomputers
- Trekking by 'JTK'
- Byting more off your Disk

Issue 3:

- AIM 65 Assembler
- Graphics Shapes (Series)
- Pilot Takes Off
- Pascal - an Introduction (series)
- Algol 68C on the Z80
- Microcomputers and Biochemistry
- Sharp Machine Language
- Super Sort

Issue 4:

- Star Gate
- Jet Set
- 6800 Processor Profile
- A Forth Introduction
- A Useful Pascal Program (series)
- A Marvel Called the MC6809
- A Number Processor for the Acorn
- Architectural Software on the Cheap
- Commercial Micro Software Fundamentals
- Social Effects of Micro Computers

Issue 5:

- Xtal Basic - The Extendable One
- Analysis of Systems Analysis
- Cesil Interpreted in Basic
- Algol 68
- Fortran 77
- Lisp
- Forms Processing
- Compiling Systems
- The Users View of Visicalc

Issue 6 (Pascal special):

- 'Warning' Prolonged use of Pascal may seriously damage your mental health
- Integer Pascal on the Nascom
- Structured and not so Structured Programming
- TCL Pascal
- A Readers Contribution
- Alarming Your Computer
- The Romplus and Keyboard Filter
- Stargate Unlocked
- Tangerine Article
- MPL Language

Issue 7 (CP/M special):

- Microcomputer Disk Operating Systems
- CP/M on the Sharp MZ-80K
- Z0 Article
- Graphics Software for the Apple II
- Introduction to Hi Resolution Graphics on the Apple
- Sharp PC 1211
- Getting More From Your Genie
- Micro Chips in Use Now
- A Simple Machine

Issue 8/9:

- Curing 'Clear' Keys
- Systems Programming with High Level Languages
- Macro's and Micro's
- Pilot Takes Off
- A Useful Romplus Programme
- M.P.L. Language
- Connecting the General Instruments AY-3-8910 Programmable Sound Generator to the 6502/6800 bus
- Sharp Basics
- Flashy Graphics
- Writing Decent Basic Programmes
- Microcomputer Communications for the Hobbyist
- Introduction to the Main Features of Algol 68
- The TRS-80's Hidden Keyboard
- Apple D.O.S. 3.3

== Notable articles ==
The article in issue number 4, "Architectural software on the cheap" was contributed by Paul Coates, then working in the School of Architecture at Liverpool Polytechnic. In the opinion of the author, this was one of the earliest examples of the serious use of cheap micros for CAD. In those days the conventional wisdom was that CAD required a much larger computer and expensive graphics hardware. The article illustrated the use of the relatively cheap combination of a PET micro and an A3 plotter for generating floor plans, shadow casting and daylight calculation. The work illustrated was funded by a small RIBA (The Royal Institute of British Architects) grant for teaching architecture using computers.

The article on TCL Pascal in issue 6 was by Anne Scott and John Stout.
