= Carlsbro =

UK-based supplier of speaker systems

- Industry: Amplification
- Founded: Nottingham, United Kingdom (1959)
- Founder: Stuart Mercer, Sheila Mercer
- Headquarters: Mansfield, United Kingdom
- Website: Official website

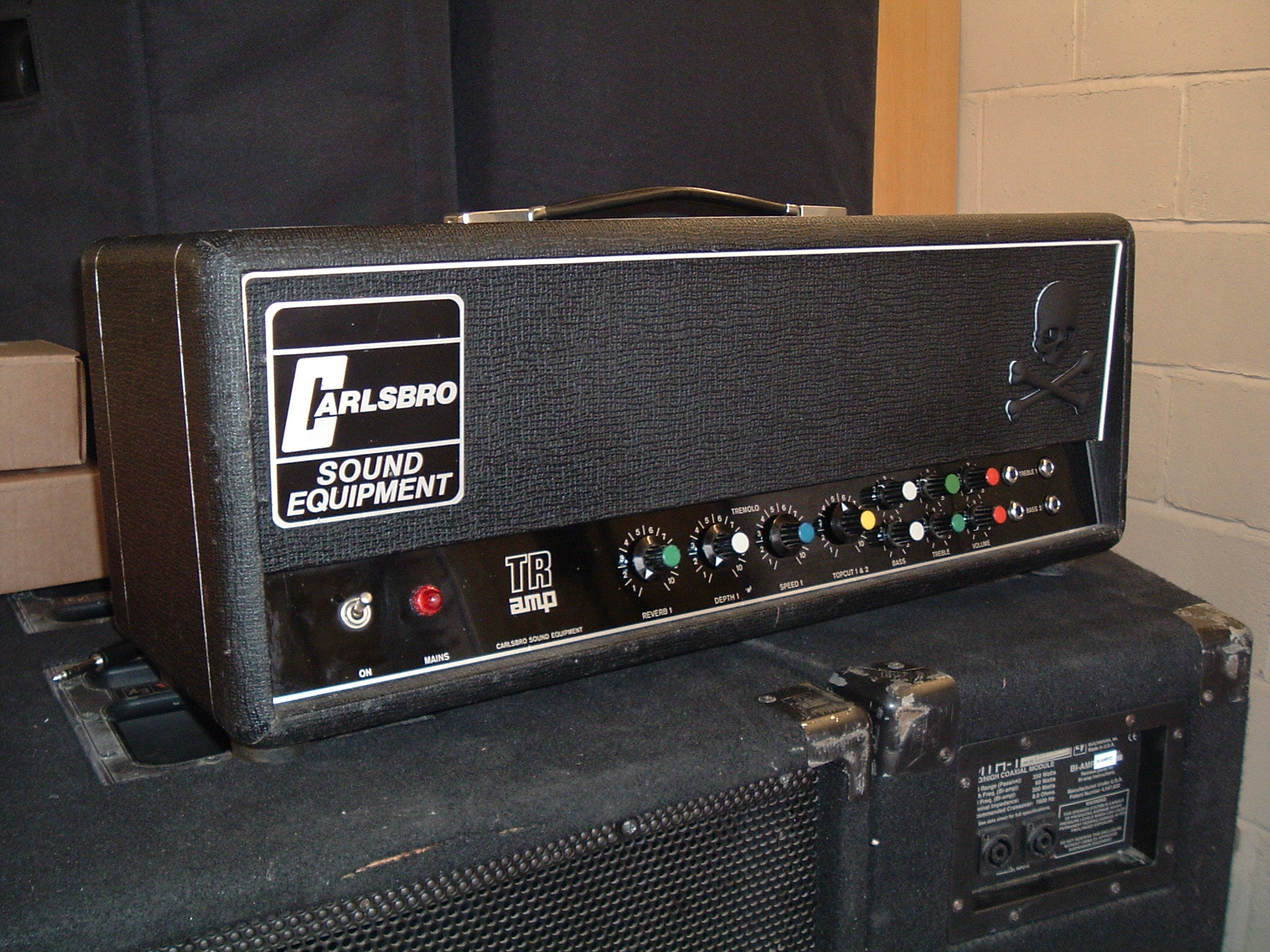

Carlsbro is a UK-based supplier of musical instrument amplification and speaker systems that was founded by Stuart and Sheila Mercer in Nottingham, England in 1960. Their equipment has been used by artists such as The Beatles, Mick Jagger, and Oasis.

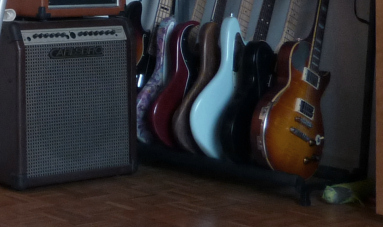

The company entered administration in 2009, but has since been relaunched.
