= RF modulator =

Device which converts video signals to the format used by over-the-air RF broadcasts

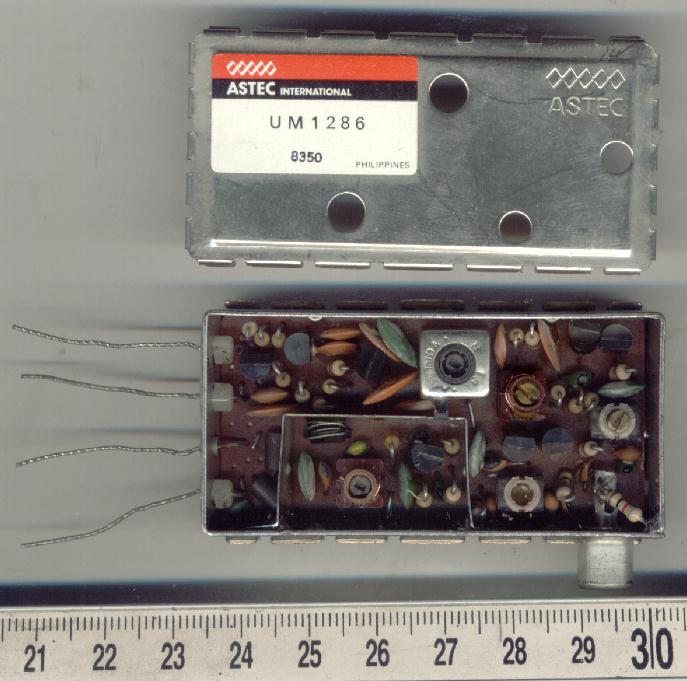
ASTEC UM 1286 UHF modulator, top cover taken off

An RF modulator (radio frequency modulator) is an electronic device used to convert signals from devices such as media players, video cassette recorders (VCRs) and game consoles to a format that can be handled by a device designed to receive a modulated RF input, such as a radio or television receiver. Its input is a baseband signal, which is used to modulate a radio frequency source.

RF modulators operate on different channels depending on the region and have been integrated into various home electronics. However, they tend to produce lower image quality than a baseband connection due to losses during the modulation and demodulation processes. In professional broadcast settings, more sophisticated modulators are used.

== History ==
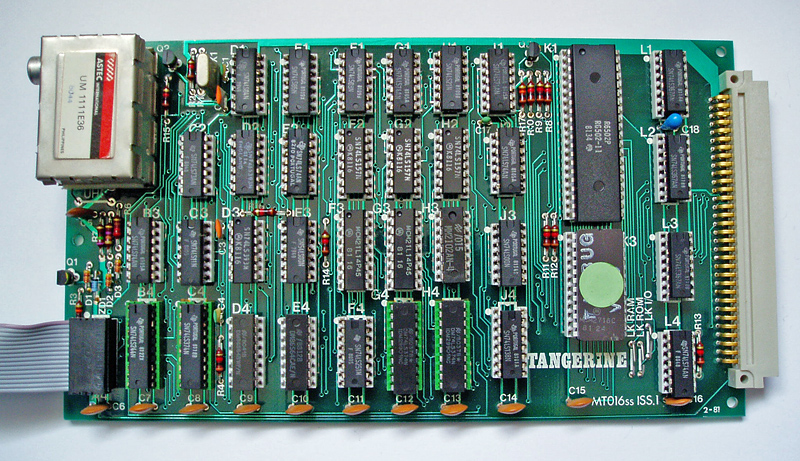
The motherboard of an early microcomputer, the Microtan 65, showing the silver-cased ASTEC 1111EM36 UHF TV modulator at top left

Prior to the introduction of specialised video connector standards such as SCART or RCA connectors, TVs were designed to only accept signals through the aerial connector: signals originate at a TV station, are transmitted over the air, and are then received by an antenna and demodulated within the TV. When equipment was developed that could use a television receiver as its display device, such as video cassette recorders (VCRs), DVD players, early home computers, and video game consoles, the signal was modulated and sent to the RF input connector.

The aerial connector, whether it is 300- or 75-ohm, is standard on all TV sets, even very old ones.

It is also common to have this type of RF output on VCRs, early DVD players, early video game consoles, and early home computers.

First- through fourth-generation video game consoles commonly used this method to connect to the television, which was used as the audio and video device for the game. In many cases, an RF modulator was used to take the composite output from the game and modulate it before sending the signal to the television.

Since later television designs include composite, S-Video, and component video jacks, which skip the modulation and demodulation steps, modulators are no longer included as standard equipment, and RF modulators are now largely a third-party product, purchased primarily to run newer equipment such as DVD players with an old television set.

== Design ==
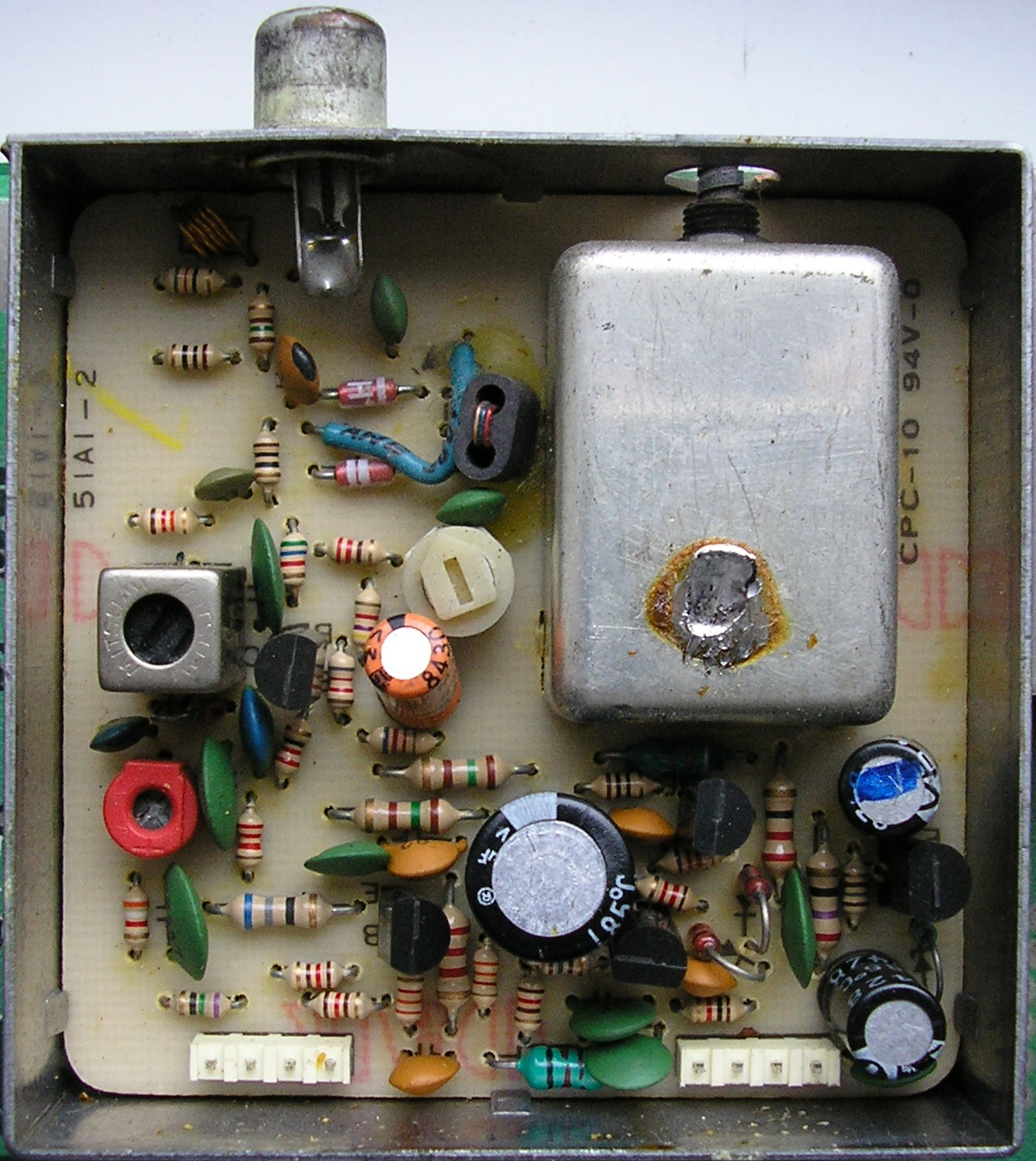
RF modulator inside the Commodore 64 manufactured in 1984, PAL system

RF modulation puts the desired information onto a carrier signal at a standardized frequency. Amplitude or frequency modulation may be used, as required by the receiving equipment.

Modulating a TV signal with stereo sound is relatively complex; most low-cost home TV modulators produce a signal with monaural audio. Even some units that have two or more audio inputs simply combine the left and right audio channels into one mono audio signal. Some used on very early home computers had no sound capability at all. Most cheaper modulators (i.e. not intended for professional use) lack vestigial sideband filtering.

TV modulators generally feature analog passthrough, meaning that they take input both from the device and from the usual antenna input, and the antenna input "passes through" to the TV, with minor insertion loss due to the added device. In some cases the antenna input is always passed through, while in other cases the antenna input is turned off when the device is outputting a signal, and only the device signal is sent onward, to reduce interference.

RF modulators produce a relatively poor picture, as image quality is lost during both the modulation from the source device and the demodulation in the television.

Consumer audiovisual devices sold in North America typically shipped with a modulator allowing for use on analog channels 3 and 4. This channel option was provided because television channels 3 and 4 were rarely assigned in the same market due to adjacent channel interference, and the use of channel 3 overall was mostly confined to medium or smaller markets. The choice allowed the user to select the unused channel in their area so that the connected device would be able to provide video and audio on an RF feed to the television without excessive interference from a broadcast signal.

Both channels being in use and receivable were rare and confined to the outskirts of markets (for instance, channel 3, WISC-TV in Madison, Wisconsin and WTMJ-TV, channel 4 in Milwaukee being both available in eastern Jefferson County); in this case, unless the viewer received cable television service where either channel could be chosen, they would have to tune to the channel with less power to their set, an alternate input, or use an alternate modulator which instead modulated on a different channel.

Other countries had the RF output for video equipment on different groups of frequencies. For example, equipment sold in Europe, South Africa and Hong Kong used UHF channels 30–39 for this purpose. Equipment sold in Japan used channel 1 or 2 (Channel 13–16 is for cable converters). With other channels being used for RF modulation functions in other regions, channel 3/4 output is a misnomer for those regions.

Recently, some RF demodulators have been marketed on obscure online markets to allow channel 3 inputs from legacy devices to work on RCA composite in.

== Uses ==
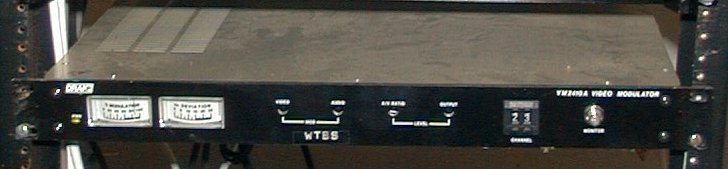
Cable TV Agile Modulator

RF modulators are commonly integrated into VCRs, in video game consoles up to and including the fourth generation, and in 8- and 16-bit home computers.

Some systems were supplied with an external modulator unit that connected to both the system and to the antenna jacks of a television. One reason for this is that a device which outputs an RF signal must in general be certified by regulatory authorities—such as the U.S. Federal Communications Commission (FCC) — and thus by having an external RF modulator, only the modulator itself needed to be certified, rather than the entire video game system. One example was the Sup'R'Mod, designed for the Apple II.

RF modulators may also be used to take the audio and video signal from a PAL or NTSC composite video, RGB, YUV or other composite AV source, and generate a broadcast RF signal that can be fed into a television's aerial/coaxial connector.

Multi-channel RF modulators are commonly used in home audio/video distribution. These devices have multiple audio and video inputs and one RF output. Audio/video outputs from source devices such as a DVD player, VCR, or DSS receiver are connected to the audio/video inputs on the modulator. The modulator is then programmed to broadcast the signals on a certain frequency. That RF broadcast is then received by the connected TV. When the TV is tuned to the programmed channel, the video and audio signal of the source device is accessed. RF modulation can become difficult in a CATV system. High-pass, low-pass, and notch filters must be used to block certain frequencies, or channels, so that the modulator can broadcast the audio/video signal of the source device on that channel.

"Professional" modulators such as those used in the CATV industry generally include vestigial sideband filtering, which is generally absent on "consumer" grade modulators.

== Audio modulators ==
Audio RF modulators are used in low-end car audio to add devices like CD changers without requiring dashboard hardware upgrades. For example, a portable CD player's headphone jack is connected to the modulator, which outputs a low-power FM radio signal that is played through the car radio. Car FM modulators suffer from loss of quality and interference issues. Later devices that would use these types of modulators would be iPods and similar portable media players.

== See also ==
- List of video connectors
- Transmitter
