= Stephen R. Bourne =

British computer scientist

Stephen Richard Bourne
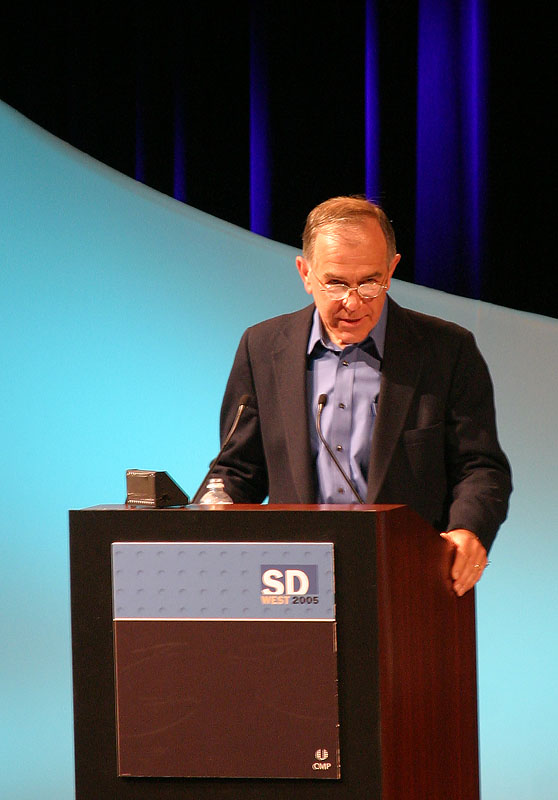
- Steve Bourne speaking at SDWest 2005
- Born: 7 January 1944 (age 82); United Kingdom
- Other name: Steve
- Education: King's College London (BSc); Trinity College, Cambridge (Dipl., PhD)
- Known for: ALGOL 68C; CAMAL; Advanced Debugger; Bourne shell The Unix System; ACM Queue
- Awards: Presidential Award, ACM, 2008; Fellow, ACM, 2005; Fellow, Royal Astronomical Society
- Scientific career
- Fields: Computer science
- Institutions: Bell Labs; Silicon Graphics; Digital Equipment Corporation; Sun Microsystems; Cisco Systems; Association for Computing Machinery; Icon Venture Partners

Stephen Richard "Steve" Bourne (born 7 January 1944) is an English computer scientist based in the United States for most of his career. He is well known as the author of the Bourne shell (sh), which is the foundation for the standard command-line interfaces to Unix.

== Biography ==
Bourne has a Bachelor of Science (BSc) degree in mathematics from King's College London, England. He has a Diploma in Computer Science and a Doctor of Philosophy (Ph.D.) in mathematics from Trinity College, Cambridge. Subsequently, he worked on an ALGOL 68 compiler at the University of Cambridge Computer Laboratory (see ALGOL 68C). He also worked on CAMAL, a system for algebraic manipulation used for lunar theory calculations.

After the University of Cambridge, Bourne spent nine years at Bell Labs with the Seventh Edition Unix team. Besides the Bourne shell, he wrote The Unix System, intended for general readers.

After Bell Labs, Bourne worked in senior engineering management positions at Silicon Graphics, Digital Equipment Corporation, Sun Microsystems, and Cisco Systems.

He was involved with developing international standards in programming and informatics, as a member of the International Federation for Information Processing (IFIP) IFIP Working Group 2.1 on Algorithmic Languages and Calculi, which specified, maintains, and supports the programming languages ALGOL 60 and ALGOL 68.

From 2000 to 2002 he was president of the Association for Computing Machinery (ACM). For his work on computing, Bourne was awarded the ACM's Presidential Award in 2008 and was made a Fellow of the organization in 2005. He is also a Fellow of the Royal Astronomical Society.

Bourne was chief technology officer at Icon Venture Partners, a venture capital firm based in Menlo Park, California through 2014. From 1990 to 1996, he served on the editorial board of UNIX Review magazine. Later, he was the chairperson of the editorial advisory board for ACM Queue, a magazine he helped found when he was president of the ACM.
