= IFIP Working Group 2.3 =

IFIP Working Group 2.3 on Programming Methodology is a working group of the International Federation for Information Processing (IFIP). Its main aim is to increase programmers’ ability to compose programs. To this end, WG2.3 provides an international forum for discussion and cross-fertilization of ideas between researchers in programming methodology and neighboring fields. Generally, members report on work in progress and expect suggestions and advice. Discussions are often broadened by inviting "observers" to meetings as full participants, some of whom eventually become members.

== Scope ==
This scope of work in WG2.3 was introduced by Edsger W. Dijkstra in meeting 0 (Oslo, Norway, July 1969). (Note: Personal communication from Doug McIlroy, founding member of WG2.3.)

- Identification of sources of difficulties encountered in present-day programming;
- The interdependence between the formulation of problems and the formulation of programs, and the mapping of relations existing in the world of problems into the relations among programs and their components;
- Intellectual disciplines and problem-solving techniques that can aid programmers in the composition of programs;
- The problem of achieving program reliability;
- The consequences of requirements for program adaptability;
- The problem of provability of program correctness and its influence on the structure of programs and on the process of their composition;
- Guidelines of partitioning large programming tasks and defining the interfaces between the parts;
- Software for mechanized assistance to program composition.

== History ==
In December 1968, IFIP Working Group 2.1 adopted the proposal by Aad van Wijngaarden as a successor to Algol 60 (ultimately leading to ALGOL 68). A group of members of WG2.1 opposed it and produced a minority report. The group also felt that rather than just programming languages, a forum was needed to discuss the general problem of programming. Another impetus for the creation of a group was the findings of the first of the NATO Software Engineering Conferences, held in 1968, which spoke of the "software crisis" then seen as gripping the computing world.

The parent committee TC2 of IFIP approved the formation of a new Working Group, WG2.3, for this purpose. Mike Woodger agreed to chair it. An organizing meeting was held in Oslo, 20–22 July 1969, with Ole-Johan Dahl, Edsger W. Dijkstra, Douglas McIlroy, Brian Randell, Gerhard Seegmueller, Wlad Turski, Mike Woodger, and Manfred Paul (chair of WG2.1) attending. Doug Ross was also a founding member. Brian Randell suggested the title Programming Methodology.

The founding members were predominately academic, and a deliberate attempt was made to bring in members from industry and commerce as well as from Asia and the USSR. WG2.3 generally meets once or twice a year for five days at a time. Until 1976, all meetings were held in Europe, but after that meetings often alternated between Europe and North America. Several meetings have been held in Australia.

The first meeting was held in Copenhagen, Denmark in 1970. It was attended by Ole-Johan Dahl, Edsger W. Dijkstra, Per Brinch Hansen, Tony Hoare, M. M. Lehman, J. Madey, Doug McIlroy, George Radin, Brian Randell, John Reynolds, Doug Ross, Christopher Strachey, and Warren Teitelman.

For more on the history of WG2.3, read Mike Woodger's A history of IFIP WG2.3.

In its initial years, WG2.3 did not produce reports of any kind of its meetings. Meetings centered on the presentation and discussion of research underway, which meant that members could receive their colleagues' constructive criticism at a much earlier stage that usual. As such, WG2.3 became a productive assembly at which researchers such as Dijkstra could work out many of the ideas that they subsequently brought forth in published papers. Ideas from the members of WG2.3 made their way into at least one well-reviewed book written in the mid-1970s.

In the late 1970s, it was felt that WG2.3 should make more public the nature of its work and what had been accomplished. Accordingly, the book Programming Methodology: A Collection of Articles by Members of IFIP WG2.3 was published.

In 2003, a second book Programming Methodology of articles was published. Some essays contained new material while others aimed to review or evaluate an area or to outline problems for further investigation.

== Members on Wikipedia, former and current ==
WG 2.3 has, and has had, many members. Some are the subject of Wikipedia articles.

- Jean-Raymond Abrial (d. 2025)
- Ralph-Johan Back
- Dines Bjørner Emeritus
- Per Brinch Hansen (d. 2007)
- Manfred Broy
- Rod Burstall (d. 2025)
- Michael Butler
- William R. Cook (d. 2022)
- Patrick Cousot
- Ole-Johan Dahl (d. 2002)
- Edsger W. Dijkstra (d. 2002)
- Sophia Drossopoulou
- David Gries Emeritus
- John Guttag Emeritus
- Eric C. R. Hehner Emeritus
- Tony Hoare (d. 2026)
- Jim Horning (d. 2013)
- Daniel Jackson
- Michael Jackson
- Cliff Jones
- Shriram Krishnamurthi Emeritus
- Butler W. Lampson Emeritus
- Gary T. Leavens
- Doug McIlroy Emeritus
- Annabelle K McIver
- George H. Mealy (d. 2010)
- Bertrand Meyer
- Jayadev Misra
- Carroll Morgan
- Peter Naur (d. 2016)
- Greg Nelson (d. 2015)
- Susan Owicki Emeritus
- David Lorge Parnas Emeritus
- Benjamin C. Pierce Emeritus
- George Radin (d. 2013)
- Brian Randell Emeritus
- John C. Reynolds (d. 2013)
- Douglas T. Ross (d. 2007)
- Fred B. Schneider Emeritus
- Natarajan Shankar
- Michel Sintzoff (d. 2010)
- Jan L. A. van de Snepscheut (d. 1994)
- Christopher Strachey (d. 1975)
- Warren Teitelman Emeritus
- Emina Torlak
- Jim Woodcock
- Niklaus Wirth (d. 2023)
- Mike Woodger Emeritus
- Pamela Zave

== Meetings ==
- WG 2.3 Meeting in Athens, Greece, 19-23 May 2025
- ...
- "Meeting 62, Los Altos, CA, USA, 28 October – 1 November, 2019". Archived from the original on 2022-09-27.
- "Meeting 61, York, UK, 4-8 February, 2019". Archived from the original on 2022-09-27.
- "Meeting 60, Providence, RI, USA, 7-11 May, 2018". Archived from the original on 2022-09-27.
- "Meeting 59, Mooloolaba, Australia, 17-21 July 2017". Archived from the original on 29 September 2022.
- "Meeting 58, Villebrumier, France, 3-7 October 2016". Archived from the original on 29 September 2022.
- "Meeting 57, Pasadena, California, USA, 11-15 March 2016". Archived from the original on 29 September 2022.
- "Meeting 56, Istanbul, Turkey, 23-27 March 2015". Archived from the original on 29 September 2022.
- "Meeting 55, Orlando, Florida, USA, 19-23 May 2014". Archived from the original on 29 September 2022.
- "Meeting 54, St. Petersburg, Russia, 3-7 June 2013". Archived from the original on 29 September 2022.
- "Meeting 53, Kirkland, WA, USA, 16-20 July 2012". Archived from the original on 29 September 2022.
- "Meeting 52, Winchester, UK, 19-23 September 2011". Archived from the original on 28 September 2022.
- "Meeting 51, Santa Barbara, CA, 17-21 January 2011". Archived from the original on 29 September 2022.
- "Meeting 50, Lachen, Switzerland, 1-5 March 2010". Archived from the original on 29 September 2022.
- "Meeting 49, MIT, Boston, MA, USA, 8-12 June 2009". Archived from the original on 29 September 2022.
- "Meeting 48, Cambridge, England, 21-25 July 2008". Archived from the original on 28 September 2022.
- "Meeting 47, Santa Fe, NM, USA, 8-12 October 2007". Archived from the original on 29 September 2022.
- "Meeting 46, Sydney, Australia, 8-12 January 2007". Archived from the original on 29 September 2022.
- "Meeting 45, Bruges, Belgium, 13-17 March 2006". Archived from the original on 28 September 2022.
- "Meeting 44, Niagara Falls, Ontario, Canada, 6-10 June 2005". Archived from the original on 29 September 2022.
- "Meeting 43, Prato, Italy, 6-10 September 2004". Archived from the original on 29 September 2022.
- "Meeting 42, Philadelphia, Pennsylvania, USA, 5-9 January 2004". Archived from the original on 29 September 2022.
- Meeting 41, Biarritz, France, 24–28 March 2003
- Meeting 40, Turku, Finland, 12–16 August 2002
- Meeting 39, Hanover, New Hampshire, USA, 2–6 October 2001
- Meeting 38, Santa Cruz, California, USA, 8–12 January 2001
- Meeting 37, Longhorseley, UK, 3–7 April 2000
- Meeting 36, Munich, Germany, 21–25 June 1999
- Meeting 35, Bloomington, Indiana, USA, 1–5 June 1998
- Meeting 34, Alsace, France, September 1997
- Meeting 33, Napa Valley, California, January 1997
- Meeting 32, Han-sur-Lesse, Belgium, April 1996
- Meeting 31, Ithaca, New York, USA, July 1995
- Meeting 30, Ispra, Italy, June 1994
- Meeting 29, Lake Simcoe, Ontario, Canada, May 1993.
- Meeting 28, New Forest, July 1992.
- Meeting 27, Pouilly-en-Auxois, France, September 1991.
- Meeting 26, Santa Catalina Island, California, USA, December 1990.
- Meeting 25, Munich, Germany, March 1990
- Meeting 24, Zaborów, Poland, June 1989
- Meeting 23, Pittsburgh, Pennsylvania, USA, August 1988
- Meeting 22, Habay-la-Neuve, Belgium, November 1987
- Meeting 21, Manchester, UK, April 1985
- Meeting 20, Victoria, British Columbia, Canada, July 1984
- Meeting 19, Pont-à-Mousson, France, September 1983
- Meeting 18, New Paltz, New York, USA, September 1982
- Meeting 17, Sintra, Portugal, October 1981
- Meeting 16, Han-sur-Lesse, Belgium, January 1981
- Meeting 15, Kazimierz Dolny, Poland, April 1980
- Meeting 14, Santa Cruz, California, USA, August 1979
- Meeting 13, Warwick, UK, April 1978
- Meeting 12, Niagara-on-the-Lake, Ontario, Canada, August 1977
- Meeting 11, St. Pierre de Chartruese, France, December 1976
- Meeting 10, Cazenovia, Illinois, USA, July 1976
- Meeting 9, Baden bei Wien, Austria, September 1975
- Meeting 8, Munich, Germany, December 1974
- Meeting 7, Boldern, Switzerland, April 1974
- Meeting 6, Blanchland, UK, October 1973
- Meeting 5, Munich, Germany, April 1973
- Meeting 4, Warsaw, Poland, September 1972
- Meeting 3, Bristol, UK, January 1972
- Meeting 2, Warwick, UK, April 1971
- Meeting 1, Copenhagen, Denmark, March 1970
- Meeting 0, Oslo, Norway, July 1969
