= Stanley B. Lippman =

American computer scientist (1950–2022)

Stanley B. Lippman (May 7, 1950 – July 31, 2022) was an American computer scientist and author. He is most widely known as an author of the C++ Primer book, which is currently published as 5th edition. Lippman has also authored the book Inside the C++ Object Model. He worked with Bjarne Stroustrup at Bell Laboratories during early stages of C++ development. In 2001, Lippman became an architect for Visual C++. In 2007, he joined Emergent Game Technologies. He then worked for NASA, Pixar and at the time of his death was working at 2kQubits according to his LinkedIn page.

== Books ==
- Stanley B. Lippman (1989). C++ Primer (1st ed., pre-standard: Cfront 2.0). ISBN 978-0201164879.
- Stanley B. Lippman (1991). C++ Primer (2nd ed., pre-standard: Cfront 3.0). ISBN 978-0201548488.
- Stanley B. Lippman (May 1996). Inside the C++ Object Model. ISBN 978-0-201-83454-3.
- Stanley B. Lippman, ed. (August 1997). C++ Gems: Programming Pearls from The C++ Report (SIGS Reference Library). ISBN 978-0-13-570581-0.
- Stanley B. Lippman; Josée Lajoie (1998). C++ Primer (3rd ed., C++98). ISBN 978-0201824704.
- Stanley B. Lippman (November 1999). Essential C++. ISBN 978-0-201-48518-9.
- Stanley B. Lippman; Josée Lajoie; Barbara E. Moo (December 2001). C# Primer: A Practical Approach. ISBN 978-0-201-72955-9.
- Stanley B. Lippman; Josée Lajoie; Barbara E. Moo (2005). C++ Primer (4th ed., C++03), ISBN 978-0201721485.
- Stanley B. Lippman; Josée Lajoie; Barbara E. Moo (August 2012). C++ Primer (5th ed.). ISBN 978-0-321-71411-4.
