= Orc (programming language) =

- Paradigm: concurrent, nondeterministic
- Designed by: Jayadev Misra
- Developer: Jayadev Misra, William R. Cook, David Kitchin, Adrian Quark, John Thywissen, Arthur Peters, and others
- First appeared: 2004
- License: New BSD License
- Website: orc.csres.utexas.edu

Influenced by
- Haskell, ML, Oz, Smalltalk, Pict

Orc is a concurrent, nondeterministic computer programming language created by Jayadev Misra at the University of Texas at Austin.

Orc provides uniform access to computational services, including distributed communication and data manipulation, through sites. Using four simple concurrency primitives, the programmer orchestrates the invocation of sites to achieve a goal, while managing timeouts, priorities, and failures.

== Bibliography ==
- Misra, Jayadev (2005). "Computation Orchestration". In Broy, Manfred; Grünbauer, Johannes; Harel, David; Hoare, Tony (eds.). Engineering Theories of Software Intensive Systems. NATO Advanced Study Institute on Engineering Theories of Software Intensive Systems. NATO Science Series. Vol. 195. Marktoberdorf, Germany: Springer. pp. 285–330. doi:10.1007/1-4020-3532-2_10. ISBN 978-1-4020-3530-2.
- Hoare, Tony; Menzel, Galen; Misra, Jayadev (2005). "A Tree Semantics of an Orchestration Language". In Broy, Manfred; Grünbauer, Johannes; Harel, David; Hoare, Tony (eds.). Engineering Theories of Software Intensive Systems. NATO Advanced Study Institute on Engineering Theories of Software Intensive Systems. NATO Science Series. Vol. 195. Marktoberdorf, Germany: Springer. pp. 331–350. doi:10.1007/1-4020-3532-2_11. ISBN 978-1-4020-3530-2.
- Misra, Jayadev (2004). A Programming Model for the Orchestration of Web Services. Software Engineering and Formal Methods. Beijing, China: IEEE. pp. 2–11. doi:10.1109/SEFM.2004.1347498. ISBN 0-7695-2222-X.
- Kitchin, David; Cook, William R.; Misra, Jayadev (2006). Baier, Christel; Hermanns, Holger (eds.). A Language for Task Orchestration and Its Semantic Properties. Concurrency Theory. Lecture Notes in Computer Science. Vol. 4137. Bonn, Germany: Springer. pp. 477–491. doi:10.1007/11817949_32. ISBN 978-3-540-37376-6.
- Misra, Jayadev; Cook, William R. (March 2007). "Computation Orchestration: A Basis for Wide-Area Computing". Software & Systems Modeling. 6 (1): 83–110. doi:10.1007/s10270-006-0012-1. ISSN 1619-1366. S2CID 19295659.
- AlTurki, Musab; Meseguer, José (2007). Real-Time Rewriting Semantics of Orc. Principles and Practice of Declarative Programming. Wroclaw, Poland: ACM. pp. 131–142. doi:10.1145/1273920.1273938. ISBN 978-1-59593-769-8.
- Rosario, Sidney; Kitchin, David; Benveniste, Albert; Cook, William; Haar, Stefan; Jard, Claude (2007). Dumas, Marlon; Heckel, Reiko (eds.). Event Structure Semantics of Orc. Web Services and Formal Methods. Lecture Notes in Computer Science. Vol. 4937. Brisbane, Australia: Springer. pp. 154–168. doi:10.1007/978-3-540-79230-7_11. ISBN 978-3-540-79229-1.
- Wehrman, Ian; Kitchin, David; Cook, William R.; Misra, Jayadev (2006). "A Timed Semantics of Orc". Theoretical Computer Science. 402 (2–3): 234–248. doi:10.1016/j.tcs.2008.04.037. ISSN 0304-3975.
- Cook, William; Misra, Jayadev (2008). "Structured Interacting Computations". In Wirsing, Martin; Banâtre, Jean-Pierre; Hölzl, Matthias; Rauschmayer, Axel (eds.). Software-Intensive Systems and New Computing Paradigms: Challenges and Visions. Lecture Notes in Computer Science. Vol. 5380. Springer. pp. 139–145. doi:10.1007/978-3-540-89437-7_9. ISBN 978-3-540-89436-0.
