= Peter Müller (computer scientist) =

German professor and computer scientist

- Born: 1972 (age 53–54); Ingolstadt, Germany
- Education: Technical University of Munich (Diploma in Computer Science); University of Hagen (PhD)
- Known for: Viper verification infrastructure, formal methods, separation logic
- Awards: ACM Fellow (2025), Test of Time Award (2025)
- Scientific career
- Fields: Computer science
- Institutions: ETH Zurich
- Thesis: Modular Specification and Verification of Object-Oriented Programs (2001)
- Doctoral advisor: Arnd Poetzsch-Heffter

Peter Müller (born 1972) is a German computer scientist and full professor of Computer Science at ETH Zurich, leading the Programming Methodology Group. His research focuses on program verification, formal methods, and programming languages.

== Education and career ==
Müller earned his doctorate in 2001 from the University of Hagen. Before joining ETH Zurich in 2003, he worked at Microsoft Research in Redmond and at Deutsche Bank in Frankfurt. He was promoted to Full Professor in 2008 and led the Institute for Programming Languages and Systems from 2017 to 2020.

== Research and impact ==
Müller's work is known for developing the Viper (Verification Infrastructure for Permission-based Reasoning) tool suite, which automates software correctness proofs and is based on separation logic. Müller is vice-chair of the IFIP Working Group 2.3 on Programming Methodology and a founding member of the working group 1.9/2.15 on Software Verification. He serves on the editorial board of the ACM Transactions on Programming Languages and Systems, the Journal of Automated Reasoning, Science of Computer Programming, and Software Testing, Verification and Reliability He is also a co-founder and member of the Board of Directors of Anapaya Systems, which commercializes the SCION Internet architecture.

== Awards and honors ==
- 2025: Fellow of the Association for Computing Machinery (ACM)
- 2025: ETAPS Test of Time Award
