= Predicative =

Predicative may refer to:

- Something having the properties of a grammatical predicate
  - Predicative expression, part of a clause that typically follows a copula (linking verb)
  - Predicative verb, a verb that behaves as a grammatical adjective
- In mathematics and logic something without impredicativity, without a self-referencing definition
- Predicative programming, a methodology for program specification and refinement
