= Pict (programming language) =

- Paradigm: Concurrent
- Developer: Benjamin C. Pierce and David N. Turner
- Typing discipline: Static
- License: GNU General Public License
- Filename extensions: .pi
- Website: www.cis.upenn.edu/~bcpierce/papers/pict/Html/Pict.html

Influenced by
- ML

Influenced
- Orc, Nomadic Pict

Pict is a statically typed programming language, one of the very few based on the π-calculus. Work on the language began at the University of Edinburgh in 1992, and development has been more or less dormant since 1998. The language is still at an experimental stage.

== Sources ==
- Benjamin C. Pierce and David N. Turner. Pict: A programming language based on the pi-calculus. Technical report, Computer Science Department, Indiana University, 1997
