= C Traps and Pitfalls =

Computer programming book by Andrew Koenig

- Author: Andrew Koenig
- Language: English
- Genre: Non-fiction
- Publisher: Addison-Wesley
- Publication date: January 11, 1989
- Publication place: United States
- Media type: Print (hardcover)
- ISBN: 0-201-17928-8

C Traps and Pitfalls is a slim computer programming book by former AT&T Corporation researcher and programmer Andrew Koenig, its first edition still in print in 2017, which outlines the many ways in which beginners and even sometimes quite experienced C programmers can write poor, malfunctioning and dangerous source code.

It evolved from an earlier technical report, by the same name, published internally at Bell Labs. This, in turn was inspired by a prior paper given by Koenig on "PL/I Traps and Pitfalls" at a SHARE conference in 1977. Koenig wrote that this title was inspired by a 1968 science fiction anthology by Robert Sheckley, "The People Trap and other Pitfalls, Snares, Devices and Delusions, as Well as Two Sniggles and a Contrivance".
