= Barbara E. Moo =

American computer scientist

- Born: South Bend, Indiana
- Education: University of Indiana at Bloomington (BA; MBA)
- Known for: C++
- Spouse: Andrew Koenig
- Scientific career
- Fields: Computer Science
- Workplaces: AT&T; Independent Consultant; Author

Barbara E. Moo is an American computer scientist known for co-authoring several books on C++, working on an early product written in C++, and directing AT&T's WorldNet AT&T's Internet services business.

== Biography ==
Moo worked at AT&T for 15 years, working on one of the first commercial products using C++. While at AT&T, she worked closely with C++ inventor Bjarne Stroustrup and managed the C++ development team for several years. She directed the development of AT&T's WorldNet Internet service business.

== Bibliography ==
- Moo, Barbara; E. Josée Lajoie; Stanley B. Lippman, "C++ Primer", 2012. ISBN 978-0321714114
- Moo, Barbara; Koenig, Andrew, Accelerated C++: Practical Programming by Example, Addison-Wesley, 2000. ISBN 0-201-70353-X
- Moo, Barbara; Koenig, Andrew, Ruminations on C++: A Decade of Programming Insight and Experience, Addison-Wesley, 1997. ISBN 0-201-42339-1

== Interview ==
- "Learning Modern C++: An Interview with Barbara Moo", interview with Jeff Martin on February 11, 2013, infoq.com.

== Quotes ==
- "Abstraction is selective ignorance" —Barbara E. Moo, Andrew R. Koenig in Accelerated C++: Practical Programming by Example, Addison-Wesley, 2000. ISBN 0-201-70353-X (and quoted in Hayles, N. Katherine, My Mother Was a Computer: Digital Subjects and Literary Texts, University of Chicago Press, 2005. Cf. p. 58)
