= Andrew Koenig (programmer) =

American computer programmer

- Born: Andrew Richard Koenig; June 1952 (age 74); New York City, U.S.
- Education: Columbia University (B.S., Mathematics; M.S., Computer Science, 1977)
- Occupation: Computer scientist
- Known for: C++, programming, writing, "Koenig lookup", "anti-pattern"
- Notable work: C Traps and Pitfalls (1988); Ruminations on C++ (1997); Accelerated C++ (2000)
- Spouse: Barbara E. Moo
- Website: www.acceleratedcpp.com/authors/koenig

Andrew Richard Koenig (IPA: [ˈkøːnɪç]; born June 1952) is a former AT&T and Bell Labs researcher and programmer. He is the author of C Traps and Pitfalls and co-author (with Barbara Moo) of Accelerated C++ and Ruminations on C++, and his name is associated with argument-dependent name lookup, also known as "Koenig lookup", though he is not its inventor. He served as the Project Editor of the ISO/ANSI standards committee for C++, and has authored over 150 papers on C++.

== Early life and career ==
Koenig graduated from The Bronx High School of Science in 1968 and went on to receive a Bachelor of Science degree and a Master of Science degree from Columbia University in New York. He was a prominent member of the Columbia University Center for Computing Activities (CUCCA) in the late 1960s and 1970s. He wrote the first e-mail program used at the university.

In 1977, he joined the technical staff of Bell Labs in Murray Hill, New Jersey, from which he later retired.

The first book he authored, in 1987, C Traps and Pitfalls, had been motivated by his prior paper and work, mostly as a staff member at Columbia University, on a different computer language, PL/I. In 1977, as a recently hired staff member at Bell Labs, he presented a paper called "PL/I Traps and Pitfalls" at a SHARE meeting in Washington, D.C.

== Selected bibliography ==
=== Books ===
- Koenig, Andrew, C Traps and Pitfalls, Reading, Mass.: Addison-Wesley, 1988, c1989. ISBN 0-201-17928-8
- Koenig, Andrew; Moo, Barbara, Ruminations on C++, Addison-Wesley, 1997. ISBN 0-201-42339-1
- Koenig, Andrew; Moo, Barbara, Accelerated C++, Addison-Wesley, 2000.ISBN 0-201-70353-X

=== Papers ===
==== 1999 ====
- Andrew Koenig, Barbara Moo: Teaching Standard C++, Part 2. Journal of Object Oriented Programming (JOOP) 11(8): 64-67 (1999)
- Andrew Koenig, Barbara Moo: Teaching Standard C++, Part 3. JOOP 11(9): 59-63 (1999)

==== 1998 ====
- A Quiet Revolution. JOOP 10(8): 10–13, 16 (1998)
- Report from Morristown. JOOP 10(9): 5-8 (1998)
- A Programming Revolution in Languages Founded on Object Logic. JOOP 11(1): 13-16 (1998)
- Is Abstraction Good? JOOP 11(2): 66-69 (1998)
- Simulating Dynamic Types in C++, Part 1. JOOP 11(3): 76–78, 80 (1998)
- Simulating Dynamic Types in C++, Part 2. JOOP 11(4): 63-67 (1998)
- Why Are Vectors Efficient? JOOP 11(5): 71-75 (1998)
- A Standard C++ Appetizer. JOOP 11(6): 85-87 (1998)
- Andrew Koenig, Barbara Moo: Teaching Standard C++. JOOP 11(7): 11-17 (1998)

==== 1997 ====
- C++ in the Classroom: A Look Forward. JOOP 10(1): 59-61 (1997)
- Turning an Interface Inside out. JOOP 10(2): 56-58 (1997)
- Which Container Should we Teach First? JOOP 10(3): 10-12 (1997)
- A ++decade of C++. JOOP 10(4): 20–23, 34 (1997)
- Inheritance and Abbreviations. JOOP 10(5): 6–9, 21 (1997)
- Report from London. JOOP 10(6): 11-16 (1997)
- Compile-Time Type Computation. JOOP 10(7): 11-14 (1997)
- The Importance — and Hazards — of Performance Measurement. JOOP 9(8): 58-60 (1997)
- Iterator Iterators and Temporal Sequences. JOOP 9(9): 66–67, 71 (1997)

==== 1996 ====
- Idiomatic Design — invited talk for ACM OOPSLA '95; published in Post-conference Proceedings and reprinted in abridged form in CACM Vol. 39, No. 11, November, 1996.
- Function Adaptors. JOOP 8(8): 51-53 (1996)
- Compatibility vs. Progress. JOOP 8(9): 48-50 (1996)
- Generic Input Iterators. JOOP 9(1): 72-75 (1996)
- Memory Allocation and C Compatibility. JOOP 9(2): 42–43, 54 (1996)
- C++ as a First Language. JOOP 9(3): 47-49 (1996)
- Design, Behavior, and Expectation. JOOP 9(4): 79-81 (1996)
- Interface and Initiative. JOOP 9(5): 64-67 (1996)
- Arithmetic Sequence Iterators. JOOP 9(6): 38–39, 92 (1996)
- Collection in C++: No Panacea, but Useful. JOOP 9(7): 55-57 (1996)

==== 1995 ====
- Introduction to Iterator Adaptors. JOOP 7(8): 66-68 (1995)
- Polymorphic Reflections. JOOP 7(9): 65–67, 80 (1995)
- Patterns and Antipatterns. JOOP 8(1): 46-48 (1995)
- Is Programming Like Photography? JOOP 8(2): 73-75 (1995)
- Wrapping up the Standard. JOOP 8(3): 60-62 (1995)
- An Example of Language-Sensitive Design. JOOP 8(4): 56–58, 61 (1995)
- Function Objects, Templates, and Inheritance. JOOP 8(5): 65–68, 84 (1995)
- Variations on a Handle Theme. JOOP 8(6): 77-80 (1995)
- Another Handle Variation. JOOP 8(7): 61-63 (1995)
- Idiomatic design. OOPS Messenger 6(4): 14-19 (1995)
- Andrew Koenig, Bjarne Stroustrup: Foundations for Native C++ Styles Softw., Pract. Exper. 25(S4): S4/45-S4/86 (1995)

==== 1994 ====
- An anecdote about ML type inference, USENIX Very High Level Languages Symposium, October 1994, Santa Fe
- When to Write Buggy Programs. JOOP 7(1): 80-82 (1994)
- Libraries in Everyday Use. JOOP 7(2): 68–72, 80 (1994)
- Templates and Generic Algorithms. JOOP 7(3): 45-47 (1994)
- Surrogate Classes in C++. JOOP 7(4): 71–72, 80 (1994)
- Generic Iterators. JOOP 7(5): 69-72 (1994)
- Thoughts on Abstraction. JOOP 7(6): 68-70 (1994)

==== 1992 ====
- Space-Efficient Trees in C++. C++ Conference 1992: 117-130

==== 1991 ====
- Andrew Koenig, Thomas A. Cargill, Keith E. Gorlen, Robert B. Murray, Michael Vilot: How Useful is Multiple Inheritance in C++? C++ Conference 1991: 81-84

==== 1990 ====
- Andrew Koenig, Bjarne Stroustrup: Exception Handling for C++. C++ Conference 1990: 149-176

==== 1988 ====
- Associative arrays in C++, Summer 1988 Usenix Conference (pp. 173–186), San Francisco

==== 1986 ====
- The Snocone Programming Language, Bell Labs Computing Science Technical Report #124, August 19, 1986

==== 1984 ====
- Automatic Software Distribution, Summer 1984 Usenix Conference (pp. 87–106), Portland, Oregon

==== 1977 ====
- "PL/I Traps and Pitfalls", presented at the SHARE conference, 1977.
