= Peter Wegner (computer scientist) =

American computer scientist

- Born: August 20, 1932; Leningrad, USSR
- Died: July 27, 2017 (aged 84)
- Education: University of London
- Awards: Fellow of the ACM (1995); Austrian Cross of Honour for Science and Art, First Class (1999)
- Scientific career
- Fields: Computer science
- Workplaces: University of London; University of Cambridge; Brown University
- Thesis: Programming Languages, Information Structures And Machine Organization (1968)
- Doctoral advisor: Maurice Wilkes
- Doctoral students: William Cook
- Website: www.cs.brown.edu/~pw

Peter A. Wegner (August 20, 1932 – July 27, 2017) was a professor of computer science at Brown University from 1969 to 1999. He made significant contributions to both the theory of object-oriented programming during the 1980s and to the relevance of the Church–Turing thesis for empirical aspects of computer science during the 1990s and present. In 2016, Wegner wrote a brief autobiography for Conduit, the annual Brown University Computer Science department magazine.

== Education ==
Wegner was educated at the University of Cambridge and received a Post-Graduate Diploma in Numerical Analysis and Automatic Computing in 1954, at a time when there were no PhD programs in computer science. He was awarded a PhD from the University of London in 1968 for his book Programming Languages, Information Structures, and Machine Organization, with Maurice Wilkes listed as his supervisor.

== Research ==
Wegner's seminal work in the area of object-oriented programming is On Understanding Types, which was co-authored with Luca Cardelli. On the relevance of the Church–Turing thesis, he co-authored several papers and co-edited a book Interactive Computation: the New Paradigm, which was published in 2006.

== Awards ==
Wegner was inducted as a Fellow of the Association for Computing Machinery (ACM) in 1995 and received the ACM Distinguished Service Award in 2000. In 1999, he was awarded the Austrian Cross of Honor for Science and Art, 1st class ("Österreichisches Ehrenkreuz für Wissenschaft u. Kunst I. Klasse"), but was hit by a bus and sustained serious brain injuries when on a trip to London to receive his award. He recovered after a lengthy coma.

He was the editor-in-chief of ACM Computing Surveys and of The Brown Faculty Bulletin.
