= BLISS =

Systems programming language

- Paradigm: Structured, imperative (procedural)
- Designed by: W. A. Wulf, D. B. Russell, A. N. Habermann
- Developer: Carnegie Mellon University
- First appeared: 1970; 56 years ago
- Stable release: BLISS-64
- Typing discipline: Typeless
- Scope: Lexical
- Platform: PDP-10, PDP-11, VAX, PRISM, MIPS, DEC Alpha, IA-32, IA-64, x86-64
- OS: Cross-platform
- Website: pdp-10.trailing-edge.com/bb-m836d-bm/

Dialects
- Common BLISS

Influenced by
- ALGOL

BLISS is a system programming language developed at Carnegie Mellon University (CMU) by W. A. Wulf, D. B. Russell, and A. N. Habermann around 1970. It was perhaps the best known system language until C debuted a few years later, after which C became common and BLISS faded into obscurity.

BLISS is a typeless block-structured programming language based on expressions rather than statements, and includes constructs for exception handling, coroutines, and macros. It does not include a goto statement.

The name is variously said to be short for Basic Language for Implementation of System Software or System Software Implementation Language, Backwards. However, in his 2015 oral history for the Babbage Institute's Computer Security History Project, Wulf claimed that the acronym was originally based on the name "Bill's Language for Implementing System Software."

The original Carnegie Mellon compiler was notable for its extensive use of optimizations, and formed the basis of the classic book The Design of an Optimizing Compiler.

Digital Equipment Corporation (DEC) developed and maintained BLISS compilers for the PDP-10, PDP-11, VAX, DEC PRISM, MIPS, DEC Alpha, and Intel IA-32, The language did not become popular among customers and few had the compiler, but DEC used it heavily in-house into the 1980s; most of the utility programs for the OpenVMS operating system were written in BLISS-32. The DEC BLISS compiler has been ported to the IA-64 and x86-64 architectures as part of the ports of OpenVMS to these platforms. The x86-64 BLISS compiler uses LLVM as its backend code generator, replacing the proprietary GEM backend used for Alpha and IA-64.

== Language description ==
BLISS has many of the features of other modern high-level languages. It has block structure, an automatic stack, and mechanisms for defining and calling recursive routines ... provides a variety of predefined data structures and ... facilities for testing and iteration ... On the other hand, BLISS omits certain features of other high-level languages. It does not have built-in facilities for input/output, because a system-software project usually develops its own input/output or builds on basic monitor I/O or screen management services ... it permits access to machine-specific features, because system software often requires this. BLISS has characteristics that are unusual among high-level languages. A name ... is uniformly interpreted as the address of that segment rather than the value of the segment ... Also, BLISS is an "expression language" rather than a "statement language".

The BLISS language has the following characteristics:

- All constants are full word for the machine being used, e.g. on a 16-bit machine such as the PDP-11, a constant is 16 bits; on a VAX computer, constants are 32 bits, and on a PDP-10, a constant is 36 bits.
- A reference to a variable is always to the address of that variable. For example, the instruction Z+8 refers to adding 8 to the address of Z, not to its value. If one needs to add 8 to the value of Z, one must prefix the variable with a period; so one would type .Z+8 to perform this function, which adds 8 to the contents of Z.
- Assignment is done with the standard = symbol, e.g. Z=8 – which says to create a full-word constant containing 8, and store it in the location whose address corresponds to that of Z. So Z+12=14 (or, alternatively 12+Z=14 though this form is considered bad practice per the BLISS documentation in Digital) places the constant 14 into the location which is 12 words after the address of Z.
- Block statements are similar to those of ALGOL: a block is started with a BEGIN statement and terminated with END. As with ALGOL, statements are separated with the semicolon (";"). When a value is computed, it is saved until the next statement terminator – which means that a value can be computed, assigned to a variable, and carried forward to the next statement, if desired. Alternatively, an open parenthesis may be used to begin a block, with the close parenthesis used to close the block. When parentheses are included in an expression, the standard precedence rules are used, in which parenthesized expressions are computed first,
- Conditional execution uses the IF expression, which tests a true-false condition, performs alternative actions, and returns a result.
- Comparison uses keywords such as EQL for equality (as opposed to overloading the = symbol for the same purpose), GTR for Greater Than, and NEQ for not equal. For example, the following code will assign the absolute value of Z to the address indicated by Q:

Q = (IF .Z GTR 0 THEN .Z ELSE -.Z);

- Identifiers (variables and constants) must be declared before use, typically using the OWN keyword. Declaring a variable normally causes the compiler to allocate space for it; when necessary, a variable may be assigned a fixed machine address via the BIND declaration. This feature is primarily used for accessing either machine registers or certain special addresses.
- Subroutines in the language are called routines, and are declared with the keyword ROUTINE.
- Macros, which allow for text substitution, are declared with the keyword MACRO.
- The language supports arrays, which are referred to as structures, and declared with the keyword VECTOR.
- The language supports some high-level programming language constructs such as:
  - Alternative execution paths via the CASE expression
  - Looping through use of the INCR expression, which is similar to ALGOL's FOR statement
  - Built-in string functions
  - Certain automatic data conversions (number to string, etc.)

== Source example ==
The following example is taken verbatim from the Bliss Language Manual:

MODULE E1 (MAIN = CTRL) =
BEGIN
FORWARD ROUTINE
    CTRL,
    STEP;
ROUTINE CTRL =
!+
! This routine inputs a value, operates on it, and
! then outputs the result.
!-
    BEGIN
    EXTERNAL ROUTINE
        GETNUM,     ! Input a number from terminal
        PUTNUM;     ! Output a number to terminal
    LOCAL
        X,          ! Storage for input value
        Y;          ! Storage for output value
    GETNUM(X);
    Y = STEP(.X);
    PUTNUM(.Y)
    END;
ROUTINE STEP(A) =
!+
! This routine adds 1 to the given value.
!-
    (.A+1);
END
ELUDOM

== Versions ==
- BLISS-10 dialect:
  - BLISS-10 - CMU's native compiler for the PDP-10
- BLISS-11 dialect:
  - BLISS-11 - CMU's PDP-10-hosted cross compiler for the PDP-11
- Common BLISS dialect (all DEC compilers):
  - BLISS-16 - A VMS-hosted cross compiler for the PDP-11
  - BLISS-16C - A PDP-10-hosted translator from a subset of Common BLISS to BLISS-11
  - BLISS-32 - A native compiler for VAX/VMS
  - BLISS-36C - A PDP-10-hosted translator from a subset of Common BLISS to BLISS-10.
  - BLISS-36 - A native compiler for the PDP-10
  - BLISS-32EN - A native 32-bit compiler for Alpha/AXP
  - BLISS-64EN - A native 64-bit compiler for Alpha/AXP
  - BLISS-32IN - A native 32-bit compiler for IA64
  - BLISS-64IN - A native 64-bit compiler for IA64
  - BLISS-32XN - A native 32-bit compiler for x86-64
  - BLISS-64XN - A native 64-bit compiler for x86-64
