= The Design of an Optimizing Compiler =

1980 computer science book

- First edition
- Author: William Wulf, Richard K. Johnson, Charles B. Weinstock, Steven O. Hobbs, and Charles M. Geschke
- Publisher: Elsevier
- Publication date: 1975
- ISBN: 0-444-00158-1

The Design of an Optimizing Compiler (Elsevier Science Ltd, 1980, ISBN 0-444-00158-1), by William Wulf, Richard K. Johnson, Charles B. Weinstock, Steven O. Hobbs, and Charles M. Geschke, was published in 1975 by Elsevier. It describes the BLISS optimizing compiler for the PDP-11, written at Carnegie Mellon University in the early 1970s. The compiler ran on a PDP-10 and was one of the first to produce well-optimized code for a minicomputer. Because of its elegant design and the quality of the generated code, the compiler and book remain classics in the compiler field.

Although the original book has been out of print for many years, a print on demand version remains available from University Microfilms International.

== Reception ==
Software: Practice and Experience said compiling experts would benefit the most with The Design of an Optimizing Compiler.
