= Jayadev Misra =

American computer scientist (born 1947)

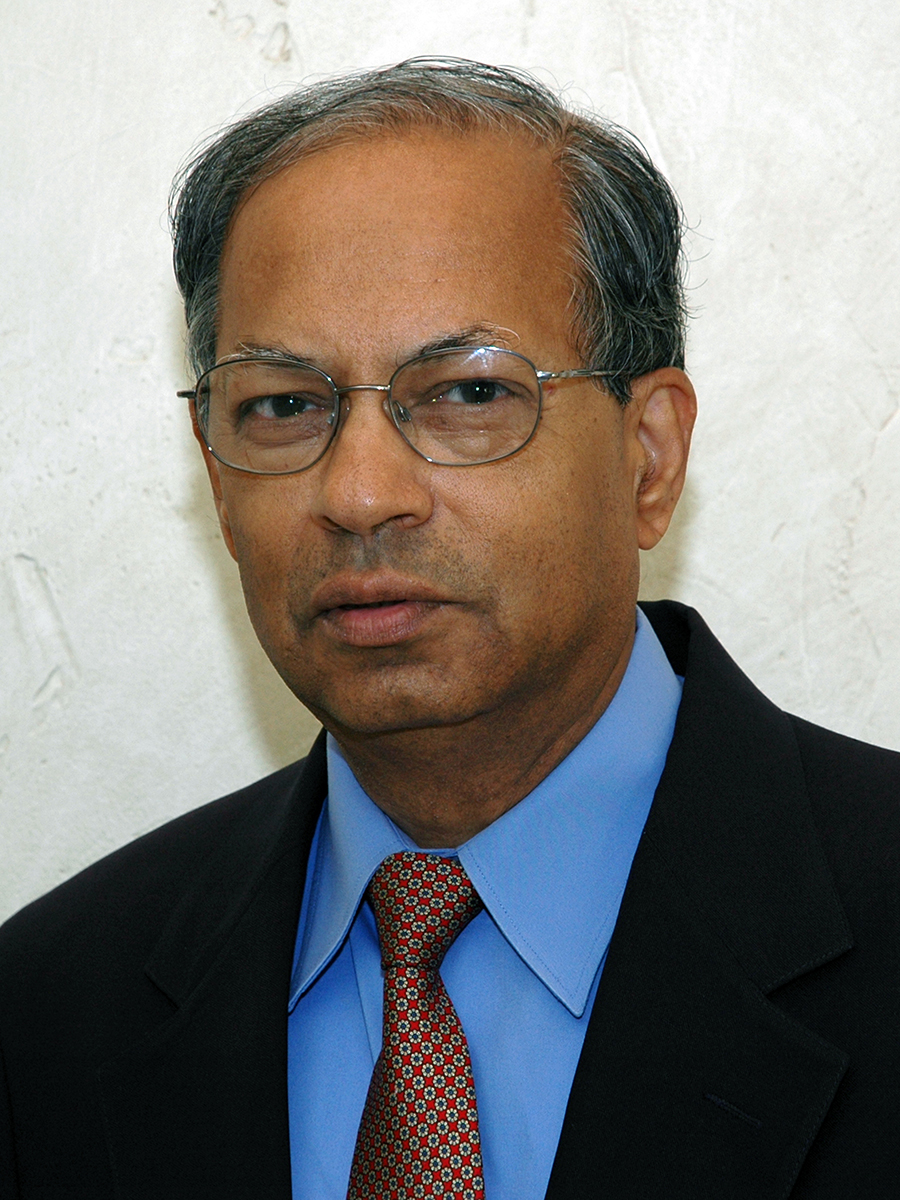
- Born: October 17, 1947; India
- Other name: Jay
- Citizenship: United States
- Education: B.Tech. (1969) IIT Kanpur; Ph.D. (1972) Johns Hopkins
- Known for: Contributions in formal aspects of distributed and concurrent computing, in particular, the Unity and Orc projects.
- Scientific career
- Fields: Computer science
- Workplaces: UT Austin
- Thesis: A Study of Strategies for Multistage Testing (1972)
- Doctoral advisor: Harlan Mills
- Website: cs.utexas.edu/users/misra

Notes
- Jayadev Misra at the Mathematics Genealogy Project

Jayadev ("Jay") Misra is an Indian-born computer scientist who has spent most of his professional career in the United States. He is the Schlumberger Centennial Chair Emeritus in computer science and a University Distinguished Teaching Professor Emeritus at the University of Texas at Austin. Professionally, he is known for his contributions to the formal aspects of concurrent programming and for jointly spearheading, with Sir Tony Hoare, the project on the Verified Software Initiative (VSI).

== Education and early career ==
Misra received a B.Tech. in electrical engineering from IIT Kanpur, India in 1969 and a Ph.D. in electrical engineering and computer science from the Johns Hopkins University, Baltimore, Maryland in 1972. After a brief period working for IBM, he joined the University of Texas at Austin in 1974, where he has remained throughout his career, except for a sabbatical year spent at Stanford University during 1983–1984. He retired from active teaching in 2015.

== Professional contributions ==
Misra and K. Mani Chandy have made several contributions in the area of concurrent computing. They developed a programming notation and a logic, called UNITY, to describe concurrent computations. Leslie Lamport says: "The first major step in getting beyond traditional programming languages to describe concurrent algorithms was Misra and Chandy's Unity" and "Misra and Chandy developed proof rules to formalize the style of reasoning that had been developed for proving invariance and leads-to properties. Unity provided the most elegant formulation yet for these proofs."

Misra and Chandy (and, independently, Randy Bryant) have developed a conservative algorithm for distributed discrete-event simulation, which is now commonly used in a variety of areas. They also developed several fundamental algorithms for resource allocation (the "drinking philosophers problem"), deadlock detection, graph algorithms, and a theory of knowledge transmission in distributed systems. In collaboration with David Gries, Misra proposed the first algorithm for the heavy-hitters problem. Misra proposed a set of axioms for concurrent memory access that underlie the theory of linearizability.

Misra's later research project called Orc aimed to develop an algebra of concurrent computing to help integrate different pieces of software for concurrent execution.

== Awards and honors ==
- IFIP Fellow, 2023.
- Member, National Academy of Engineering, 2018.
- Harry H. Goode Memorial Award, IEEE, 2017.
- Doctor Honoris Causa, École normale supérieure Paris-Saclay, Cachan, France, 2010.
- Guggenheim Fellowship, 1988.
- Identified as a "highly cited researcher" by Thomson Reuters ISI, 2004.
- ACM Fellow, 1995.
- IEEE Fellow, 1992.
- Distinguished alumnus, IIT Kanpur, India,
- Member, TAMEST (The Academy of Medicine, Engineering and Science of Texas), 2018.

== Selected publications ==
- Effective Theories in Programming Practice, ACM Books, 2023
- Parallel Program Design - a Foundation (with K.M. Chandy), 1988
- Distributed discrete-event simulation, 1986
- Proofs of networks of processes (with Mani Chandy), 1981
- Distributed deadlock detection (with Mani Chandy and Laura M. Haas), 1983
- The drinking philosophers problem (with Mani Chandy), 1984
- Finding repeated elements (with David Gries), 1982
- How processes learn (with Mani Chandy), 1985
- The Orc Programming Language (with D. Kitchin, A. Quark, and W. Cook), 2009
- Axioms for memory access in asynchronous hardware systems, 1986
- Powerlist: A structure for parallel recursion, 1994
- Verified Software: Theories, Tools, Experiments Vision of a Grand Challenge Project (with Tony Hoare), 2008
