= Susan Owicki =

American computer scientist

- Owicki in 2026
- Education: Cornell University
- Occupations: Computer scientist Marriage and family therapist
- Known for: ACM Fellow
- Spouse: Jack Owicki
- Children: Two

Susan Owicki is a computer scientist, Association for Computing Machinery (ACM) Fellow, and a founding member of the Systers mailing list for women in computing. She changed careers in the early 2000s and became a licensed marriage and family therapist.

== Early life and education ==
Owicki received her PhD in computer science from Cornell University in 1975. Her advisor was David Gries. In her thesis, she invented Interference freedom, a method for proving concurrent programs correct, which is the basis for much of the ensuing work on developing concurrent programs with shared variables and proving them correct. Two papers resulted directly from her thesis:

She was a faculty member at Stanford University for the Electrical Engineering and Computer Science Departments for 10 years. Her research interests include distributed systems, performance analysis, and trusted systems for electronic commerce and she published numerous articles and patents on her research.

In 1994 Owicki was recognized as an ACM Fellow for her dissertation work An Axiomatic Proof Technique for Parallel Programs I.

== Career ==
After Stanford, Susan Owicki worked at Digital Equipment Corporation (DEC).

She later worked at the Strategic Technologies and Architectural Research Laboratory (STAR lab) where she held a role as Associate Director. STAR lab was the first laboratory devoted to research in digital rights management and related electronic commerce technologies.

She spent four years as an independent consultant doing work in the performance of interactive television and delivery of streaming video.

== Personal life ==
Owicki is married to Jack Owicki and has two children.

== Publications ==
Owicki's publications include

- Susan Owicki; David Gries (1976). "An Axiomatic Proof Technique for Parallel Programs I" (winner of the 1977 ACM Programming Systems and Languages Paper Award.)
- Forest Baskett; James H. Clark; John L. Hennessy; Susan Owicki; Brian Reid. "Research in VLSI Systems Design and Architecture". Stanford University. 1981.
- Susan S Owicki; Leslie Lamport. "Proving Liveness Properties of Concurrent Programs". ACM TOPLAS. (4:3): 455-495.
- Amy L. Lansky and Susan S. Owicki, "GEM: A Tool for Concurrency Specification and Verification,", in Proceedings of the Second Annual ACM Symposium on Principles of Distributed Computing, ACM, Montreal, Quebec, Canada, 1983.
- Thomas E. Anderson; Susan S. Owicki; James B. Saxe; Charles P. Thacker (1993). "High-speed Switch Scheduling for Local-Area Networks". ACM TOCS. (11:4): 319-352.

A more complete list of publications is available online.

== Patents ==
Owicki's patents include

- U.S. patent 5,446,901 - Fault tolerant distributed garbage collection system and method for collecting network objects
- U.S. patent 7,770,016 - Systems and methods for watermarking software and other media

== Marriage and family therapist ==
Until her retirement in 2019, Owicki was a licensed marriage and family therapist. She maintained a private practice and was on the staff of the Stanford University faculty and staff help center.
