= David Gries =

American computer scientist

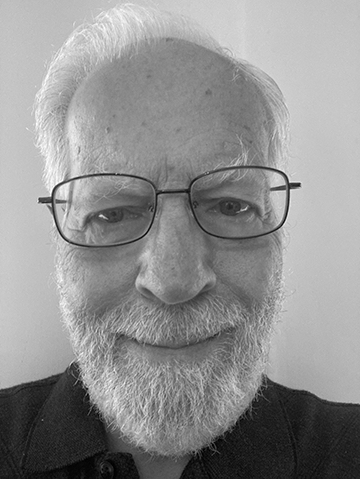
- David Gries in 2022
- Born: April 26, 1939 (age 87); Flushing, Queens, New York, United States
- Education: Queens College, City University of New York (BS); University of Illinois Urbana-Champaign (MS); Technical University of Munich (Dr)
- Known for: First text on Compiler construction (1971); Interference freedom Contributions to programming methodology, algorithms, CS education
- Awards: AFIPS Education Award (1986); ACM SIGCSE Award for Outstanding Contributions to Computer Science Education (1991); IEEE Computer Society Taylor L. Booth Education Award (1994); ACM Karl V. Karlstrom Outstanding Educator Award (1995)
- Scientific career
- Fields: Computer science
- Workplaces: U.S. Naval Weapons Laboratory; Stanford University; University of Georgia; Cornell University
- Doctoral advisors: Friedrich L. Bauer; Josef Stoer
- Doctoral students: Susan Graham (1971); Susan Owicki (1975); Jennifer Widom (1989); T. V. Raman (1994); Michael E. Caspersen (2007)
- Website: cs.cornell.edu/gries

David Gries (born April 26, 1939) is an American computer scientist at Cornell University, mainly known for his books The Science of Programming (1981) and A Logical Approach to Discrete Math (1993, with Fred B. Schneider).

He was associate dean for undergraduate programs at the Cornell University College of Engineering from 2003–2011. His research interests include programming methodology and related areas such as programming languages, related semantics, and logic. His son, Paul Gries, has been a co-author of an introductory textbook to computer programming using the language Python and is a teaching stream professor in the Department of Computer Science at the University of Toronto.

== Life ==
Gries earned a Bachelor of Science (B.S.) from Queens College in 1960. He spent the next two years working as a programmer-mathematician for the United States Naval Weapons Laboratory, where he met his wife, Elaine.

He earned a Master of Science (M.S.) in mathematics from the University of Illinois at Urbana-Champaign in 1963. While at Illinois, Gries worked with Manfred Paul and Ruediger Wiehle to write a full compiler for the language ALGOL 60 for the IBM 7090 mainframe computer. He earned his Dr. rer. nat. in 1966 from the TH München, studying under Friedrich L. Bauer and Josef Stoer.

Gries is member emeritus of IFIP Working Group 2.3, whose aim is to increase programmers' ability to compose programs, and he edited Programming Methodology: a Collection of Articles by Members of IFIP WG2.3, which highlights the work of this group in its first ten years.

Gries was an assistant professor at Stanford University from 1966–1969 and then became an associate professor at Cornell University in Ithaca, New York. He spent the next 30 years there, including time as chair of the computer science department from 1982–1987. Gries had a Guggenheim Fellowship in 1984–1985. He spent 1999–2002 at the University of Georgia in Athens and returned to Cornell in January 2003.

Gries was an advocate of treating formal methods in programming as a core computer science topic and teaching it to undergraduates, a stance that found large amounts of debate within the computer science education community. Around 700 students and fellow faculty members were in attendance for his final lecture, given to his "Programming and Data Structures" class, in May 2022.

He is author, co-author, or editor of seven textbooks and 75 research papers. His papers are archived at Cornell.

As of 2021, he lives in Ithaca, New York.

== Textbooks ==
Gries' 1971 work Compiler Construction for Digital Computers was the first textbook to be published on designing and implementing language compilers. It was also one of the first textbooks to be written and produced using computers, in this case punched cards input to a text-formatting program that ran on an IBM System/360 Model 65; the early technology used eventually resulted in the book having a somewhat dated appearance. Compiler Construction for Digital Computers sold well and went through more than twenty printings, although over time it would be eclipsed in renown by "the Dragon Book", Alfred V. Aho and Jeffrey D. Ullman's 1977 volume Principles of Compiler Design. Nonetheless, Dutch computer scientist Dick Grune has written of Compiler Construction for Digital Computers that "entire generations of compiler constructors have grown up with it and they have not regretted it."

The textbook An Introduction to Programming: A Structured Approach Using PL/I and PL/C was co-written with his computer scientist colleague Richard W. Conway and published in 1973. It used the PL/C dialect developed at Cornell and went through several editions and adaptations. It stressed the discipline of structured programming throughout, becoming one of the most prominent textbooks to do so, and introduced considerations of program correctness, becoming the first introductory textbook to do so.

In 1981, Gries published The Science of Programming, a textbook that covers program verification. It presents propositional calculus and uses it to formalize the treatment of preconditions, postconditions, invariants, and related entities, and then provides practical stratagems for program development via identifying those logical entities from a problem specification. A review in ACM SIGSOFT Software Engineering Notes found the book to be valuable in the logic and stratagem aspects, but too focused on low-level programming with no abstract data types discussed other than the simple array. Writing in Communications of the ACM, computer scientist Jon Bentley said The Science of Programming was "an excellent introduction to the field" and said that professional programmers could benefit from studying it and using program verification techniques in their own projects.

A Logical Approach to Discrete Math was co-authored with Fred B. Schneider and published in 1993. A paper from a faculty member at Southwestern University advocating teaching the subjects the book covered to first-year undergraduates and called it "an ideal text covering predicate calculus for use in programming." Similarly, a faculty member at Pepperdine University stated that, "My experience with A Logical Approach to Discrete Math convinced me that formal methods are easily mastered at the undergraduate level."

== Selected works ==
- Gries, D. (1971). Compiler Construction for Digital Computers (in English, Spanish, Japanese, Chinese, Italian, and Russian). New York: John Wiley and Sons. ISBN 0-471-32776-X. "The first text on compiler writing."
- Gries, D.; Conway, R. (1973). An Introduction to Programming: a structured approach, Edition 1. Cambridge: Winthrop.
- Owicki, S.; Gries, D. (1976). "Verifying properties of parallel programs: an axiomatic approach". Communications of the ACM. 19 (5): 279–285. doi:10.1145/360051.360224. S2CID 9099351.
- Owicki, S.; Gries, D. (1976). "An axiomatic proof technique for parallel programs I". Acta Informatica. 6 (4). Berlin: Springer (Germany): 319–340. doi:10.1007/BF00268134. S2CID 206773583.
- Gries, D., ed. (1979) Programming Methodology: a Collection of Articles by Members of IFIP WG2.3
- Gries, D. (1981). The Science of Programming. Monographs in Computer Science (in English, Spanish, Japanese, Chinese, Italian, and Russian). New York: Springer Verlag. doi:10.1007/978-1-4612-5983-1. ISBN 978-0-387-96480-5. S2CID 37034126.
- Gries, D.; Feijen, W.H.J.; van Gasteren, A.J.M.; Misra, J., eds. (1990). Beauty is our Business. Monographs in Computer Science. New York: Springer Verlag. doi:10.1007/978-1-4612-4476-9. ISBN 978-1-4612-8792-6. S2CID 24379938.
- Gries, D.; Schneider, F. B. (1993). A Logical Approach to Discrete Math. Monographs in Computer Science. New York: Springer Verlag. doi:10.1007/978-1-4757-3837-7. ISBN 978-1-4419-2835-1. S2CID 206657798.
- Gries, D.; De Roever, W. P., eds. (1998). Programming Concepts and Methods PROCOMET '98. IFIP Advances in Information and Communication Technology. London: Springer. doi:10.1007/978-0-387-35358-6. ISBN 978-1-4757-6299-0. S2CID 30793173.
- Gries, D.; Gries, P. (2004). Multimedia Introduction to Programming Using Java. New York: Springer Verlag. doi:10.1007/b138328. ISBN 0-387-22681-8. "Came with a CD called 'Program Live' with videos."
- Gries, D. (2022). JavaHyperText and Data Structures. Ithaca, New York. "Free online text with over 50 videos."

== Awards ==
- Lifetime Achievement Award for Teaching from Cornell Bowers CIS – inaugural recipient (2022)
- Tau Beta Pi Professor of the Year (2022)
- Oldest paper in the ACM SIGCSE Technical Symposium Top Ten Papers of All Time (2019)
- Amity Booker Prize, with Paul Gries (2016)
- Honorary Doctor of Science, Miami University, Oxford, Ohio (1999) (Note: The Cornell CS Department Timeline announces this doctorate)
- Honorary Doctor of Laws, Daniel Webster College, Nashua, New Hampshire (1996) (Note: The Cornell CS Department Timeline announces this doctorate)
- "ACM Karl V. Karlstrom Outstanding Educator Award". (1995)
- Weiss Presidential Fellow –among the first ten Fellows (1995)
- Advisor of T.V. Raman, whose Ph.D. thesis won the annual "ACM Doctoral Dissertation Award". (1995)
- IEEE-CS "Taylor L. Booth Education Award". April 3, 2018. (1994)
- Charter Fellow, ACM (1994)
- CRA Distinguished Service Award (1991)
- Fellow, AAAS (1990)
- ACM SIGCSE Award for Outstanding Contribution to CS Education (1991)
- AFIPS Education Award (1986)
- Guggenheim Fellowship (1983)
- ACM Programming Systems and Languages Paper Award, with Susan Owicki, for the "Verifying properties of parallel programs: an axiomatic approach" paper (1977)
- Superior Accomplishment Award, U.S. Naval Weapons Lab, Dahlgren, Va. (1961)
