= George Radin =

American computer scientist

- Born: January 22, 1931
- Died: May 21, 2013 (aged 82); Agawam, Massachusetts
- Education: Brooklyn College; Columbia University; City University of New York
- Known for: PL/I; OS/360; TSS/360
- Awards: IBM Fellow
- Scientific career
- Workplaces: IBM

George Radin (January 22, 1931 – May 21, 2013) was an American computer scientist. He gained his BA in English Literature from Brooklyn College in 1951, followed by an MA from Columbia University in 1952 and an MSc in mathematics from City University of New York in 1961. In 1963 he got a job with the IBM Advanced Computer Utilization Department, where he helped develop the PL/I programming language and design the OS/360 and TSS/360 systems. In 1980, he was appointed an IBM Fellow.
