= UNITY (programming language) =

Theoretical programming language for describing concurrent computations

UNITY is a programming language constructed by K. Mani Chandy and Jayadev Misra for their book Parallel Program Design: A Foundation. It is a theoretical language which focuses on what, instead of where, when or how. The language contains no method of flow control, and program statements run in a nondeterministic way until statements cease to cause changes during execution. This allows for programs to run indefinitely, such as auto-pilot or power plant safety systems, as well as programs that would normally terminate (which here converge to a fixed point).

== Description ==
All statements are assignments, and are separated by #. A statement can consist of multiple assignments, of the form a,b,c := x,y,z, or a := x || b := y || c := z. You can also have a quantified statement list, <# x,y : expression :: statement>, where x and y are chosen randomly among the values that satisfy expression. A quantified assignment is similar. In <|| x,y : expression :: statement >, statement is executed simultaneously for all pairs of x and y that satisfy expression.

== Examples ==
=== Bubble sort ===
Bubble sort the array by comparing adjacent numbers, and swapping them if they are in the wrong order. Using $\Theta(n)$ expected time, $\Theta(n)$ processors and $\Theta(n^2)$ expected work. The reason you only have $\Theta(n)$ expected time, is that k is always chosen randomly from $\{0,1\}$. This can be fixed by flipping k manually.

Program bubblesort
declare
    n: integer,
    A: array [0..n-1] of integer
initially
    n = 20 #
    <|| i : 0 <= i and i < n :: A[i] = rand() % 100 >
assign
    <# k : 0 <= k < 2 ::
        <|| i : i % 2 = k and 0 <= i < n - 1 ::
            A[i], A[i+1] := A[i+1], A[i] 
                if A[i] > A[i+1] > >
end

=== Rank-sort ===
You can sort in $\Theta(\log n)$ time with rank-sort. You need $\Theta(n^2)$ processors, and do $\Theta(n^2)$ work.

Program ranksort
declare
    n: integer,
    A,R: array [0..n-1] of integer
initially
    n = 15 #
    <|| i : 0 <= i < n :: 
        A[i], R[i] = rand() % 100, i >
assign
    <|| i : 0 <= i < n ::
        R[i] := <+ j : 0 <= j < n and (A[j] < A[i] or (A[j] = A[i] and j < i)) :: 1 > >
    #
    <|| i : 0 <= i < n ::
        A[R[i]] := A[i] >
end

=== Floyd–Warshall algorithm ===
Using the Floyd–Warshall algorithm all pairs shortest path algorithm, we include intermediate nodes iteratively, and get $\Theta(n)$ time, using $\Theta(n^2)$ processors and $\Theta(n^3)$ work.

Program shortestpath
declare
    n,k: integer,
    D: array [0..n-1, 0..n-1] of integer
initially
    n = 10 #
    k = 0 #
    <|| i,j : 0 <= i < n and 0 <= j < n :: 
        D[i,j] = rand() % 100 >
assign
    <|| i,j : 0 <= i < n and 0 <= j < n ::
        D[i,j] := min(D[i,j], D[i,k] + D[k,j]) > ||
    k := k + 1 if k < n - 1
end

We can do this even faster. The following programs computes all pairs shortest path in $\Theta(\log^2 n)$ time, using $\Theta(n^3)$ processors and $\Theta(n^3 \log n)$ work.

Program shortestpath2
declare
    n: integer,
    D: array [0..n-1, 0..n-1] of integer
initially
    n = 10 #
    <|| i,j : 0 <= i < n and 0 <= j < n ::
        D[i,j] = rand() % 10 >
assign
    <|| i,j : 0 <= i < n and 0 <= j < n ::
        D[i,j] := min(D[i,j], <min k : 0 <= k < n :: D[i,k] + D[k,j] >) >
end

After round $r$, D[i,j] contains the length of the shortest path from $i$ to $j$ of length $0 \dots r$. In the next round, of length $0 \dots 2r$, and so on.
