= Jim Horning =

American computer scientist (1942–2013)

- Born: August 24, 1942
- Died: January 18, 2013 (aged 70); Palo Alto, California
- Education: Stanford University
- Scientific career
- Workplaces: University of Toronto; Palo Alto Research Center; DEC Systems Research Center; Intertrust Technologies Corporation
- Thesis: A Study of Grammatical Inference (1969)
- Doctoral advisor: Jerome A. "Jerry" Feldman
- Doctoral students: John Guttag

James Jay Horning (August 24, 1942 – January 18, 2013) was an American computer scientist and ACM Fellow.

== Overview ==
Jim Horning received a PhD in computer science from Stanford University in 1969 for a thesis entitled A Study of Grammatical Inference. He was a founding member, and later chairman, of the Computer Systems Research Group at the University of Toronto, Canada, from 1969 until 1977. He collaborated in the design of the programming language Euclid there. He was then a research fellow at the Xerox Palo Alto Research Center (PARC) from 1977 until 1984 and a founding member and senior consultant at DEC Systems Research Center (DEC/SRC) from 1984 until 1996. He was founder and director of STAR Lab from 1997 until 2001 at Intertrust Technologies Corporation.

Peter G. Neumann reported on 22 January 2013 in the RISKS Digest, volume 27, issue 14, that Horning had died on 18 January 2013 in Palo Alto, California.

Horning's interests included programming languages, programming methodology, specification, formal methods, digital rights management and computer/network security. A major contribution was his involvement with the Larch approach to formal specification with John Guttag (MIT) et al.

== Selected publications ==
- A Compiler Generator (with William M. McKeeman and D. B. Wortman), Prentice Hall (1970). ISBN 0-13-155077-2.
- Garland, S. J.; Jones, K. D.; Modet, A.; Wing, J. M. (1993). Guttag, J. V.; Horning, J. J. (eds.). Larch: Languages and Tools for Formal Specification. Springer-Verlag. doi:10.1007/978-1-4612-2704-5. ISBN 978-1-4612-7636-4. S2CID 13066418.
- Denning, P.; Horning, J.; Parnas, D.; Weinstein, L. (December 2005). "Wikipedia risks". Communications of the ACM. 48 (12): 152. doi:10.1145/1101779.1101804. S2CID 20322967.
- Horning, J.; Neumann, P. G. (June 2008). "Risks of neglecting infrastructure". Communications of the ACM. 51 (6): 112. doi:10.1145/1349026.1349047. S2CID 32720694.
