= William Cook (computer scientist) =

American computer scientist (1963–2021)

William R. Cook
- Born: November 21, 1963
- Died: October 27, 2021 (aged 57); Austin, Texas, U.S.
- Known for: Denotational semantics of Inheritance; Object-oriented programming; AppleScript

Academic background
- Education: Brown University (PhD)
- Thesis: A denotational semantics of inheritance (1989)
- Doctoral advisor: Peter Wegner

Academic work
- Discipline: Computer science
- Institutions: University of Texas at Austin, Apple Inc., HP Labs

William Randall Cook (November 21, 1963 – October 27, 2021) was an American computer scientist, who was an associate professor in the Department of Computer Science at the University of Texas at Austin.

== Early life and education ==
Cook was born on November 21, 1963. He received his Ph.D. in computer science from Brown University in 1989.

== Career ==
Cook's research concentrated on object-oriented programming, programming languages, modeling languages, and the interface between programming languages and databases. Prior to joining UT in 2003, he was chief technology officer and co-founder of Allegis Corporation, where he was chief architect for several award-winning products, including the eBusiness Suite at Allegis, the writer's Solution for Prentice Hall, and the AppleScript language at Apple Computer.

Cook won the Senior Dahl–Nygaard Prize in 2014.

== Personal life ==
Cook died on October 27, 2021, at the age of 57.

== Selected papers ==
- Inheritance is not subtyping, Proceedings of the 17th ACM SIGPLAN-SIGACT symposium on Principles of programming languages (1990)
- AppleScript. Proceedings of the third ACM SIGPLAN conference on History of programming languages (HOPL III) Pages 1–21 ACM, 2007.
