= John Guttag =

American computer scientist (born 1949)

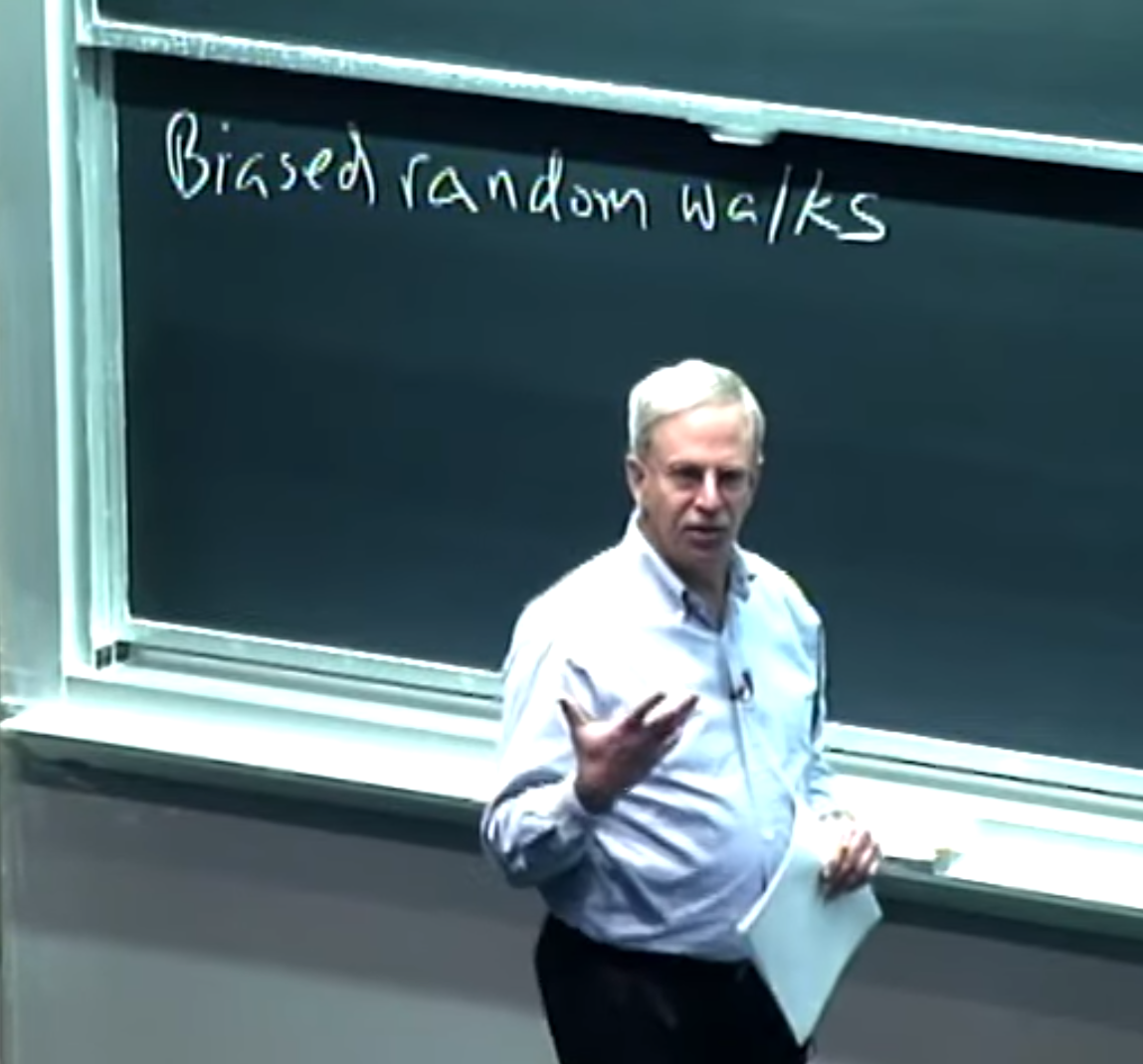
- Born: 1949 (age 76–77)
- Education: Brown University; University of Toronto
- Scientific career
- Thesis: The Specification and Application to Programming of Abstract Data Types (1975)
- Doctoral advisor: Jim Horning
- Doctoral students: Jeannette Wing; Joseph Zachary; Katherine Yelick; Daniel Jackson; Raymie Stata; Vanu Bose
- Website: people.csail.mit.edu/guttag/

John Vogel Guttag (born March 6, 1949) is an American computer scientist, professor, and former head of the department of electrical engineering and computer science at MIT. He conducts research on computer networks and medical applications of AI as co-lead of the MIT Computer Science and Artificial Intelligence Laboratory's Networks and Mobile Systems Group.

== Education and career ==
John Guttag was raised in Larchmont, New York, the son of Irwin Guttag (1916–2005) and Marjorie Vogel Guttag.

John Vogel Guttag received a bachelor's degree in English from Brown University in 1971, and a master's degree in applied mathematics from Brown in 1972. In 1975, he received a doctorate in Computer Science from the University of Toronto. He was a member of the faculty at the University of Southern California from 1975 to 1978, and joined the Massachusetts Institute of Technology faculty in 1979.

From 1993 to 1998, he served as associate department head for computer science of MIT's electrical engineering and computer science Department. From January 1999 through August 2004, he served as head of that department. EECS, with approximately 2000 students and 125 faculty members, is the largest department at MIT. He helped student Vanu Bose start a company with software-defined radio technology developed at MIT.

With CSAIL's Networks and Mobile Systems Group, Guttag studies issues related to computer networks, applications of networked and mobile systems, and advanced software-based medical instrumentation and decision systems. He has also done research, published, and lectured in the areas of software engineering, mechanical theorem proving, hardware verification, compilation, software radios, and medical computing.

Guttag serves on the board of directors of Empirix and Avid Technology, and on the board of trustees of the Massachusetts General Hospital Institute of Health Professions. He is a member of the American Academy of Arts and Sciences. In 2006 he was inducted as a fellow of the Association for Computing Machinery. He is one of the founders of Health[at]Scale Technologies, a machine learning and artificial intelligence company.

== Selected publications ==
- Syed, Z.; Leeds, D.; Curtis, D.; Guttag, J.; Nesta, F.; Levine, R. A. (2006). "Audio-Visual Tools for Computer-Assisted Diagnosis of Cardiac Disorders". 19th IEEE Symposium on Computer-Based Medical Systems (CBMS'06). pp. 207–212. doi:10.1109/CBMS.2006.50.
- Shoeb, A.; Edwards, H.; Connolly, J.; Bourgeois, B.; Treves, T.; Guttag, J. (2004). "Patient-specific seizure onset detection" (PDF). The 26th Annual International Conference of the IEEE Engineering in Medicine and Biology Society. Vol. 1. pp. 419–422. doi:10.1109/IEMBS.2004.1403183. hdl:1721.1/17991. ISBN 0-7803-8439-3.
- Liskov, Barbara; Guttag, John V. (2000). Program Development in Java: Abstraction, Specification, and Object-oriented Design. Addison-Wesley. ISBN 0-201-65768-6.
- Garland, S. J.; Jones, K. D.; Modet, A.; Wing, J. M. (1993). Guttag, J. V.; Horning, J. J. (eds.). Larch: Languages and Tools for Formal Specification. Springer-Verlag. doi:10.1007/978-1-4612-2704-5. ISBN 978-1-4612-7636-4. S2CID 13066418.
- Guttag, J. (June 1977). "Abstract data types and the development of data structures". Comm. ACM. 20 (6): 396–404. doi:10.1145/359605.359618. S2CID 18567275.
