= Fred B. Schneider =

American computer scientist

- Born: December 7, 1953 (age 72)
- Education: Stony Brook University
- Known for: Distributed computing
- Awards: IEEE Emanuel R. Piore Award (2012); NAE (2011); IEEE Fellow (2008); ACM Fellow (1995); AAAS Fellow (1992)
- Scientific career
- Fields: Computer science
- Workplaces: Cornell University
- Doctoral advisor: Arthur Jay Bernstein

Fred Barry Schneider (born December 7, 1953) is an American computer scientist, based at Cornell University, where he is the Samuel B. Eckert Professor of Computer Science. He has published in numerous areas including science policy, cybersecurity, and distributed systems. His research is in the area of concurrent and distributed systems for high-integrity and mission-critical applications.

Schneider received a B.Sc. degree in Engineering from Cornell University in 1975 followed by a Ph.D. from Stony Brook University where he was a student of Arthur J. Bernstein. In Fall 1978, he joined the faculty at Cornell University.

He has been editor-in-chief of Distributed Computing and associate editor-in-chief of IEEE Security and Privacy. He has also edited ACM Computing Surveys, High Integrity Systems, IEEE Transactions on Dependable and Secure Computing, and Information Processing Letters.

Schneider is a Fellow of the American Association for the Advancement of Science (1992), the Association for Computing Machinery (1995), the Institute of Electrical and Electronics Engineers (2008), and the Norwegian Academy of Technological Sciences. He was also elected a member of the National Academy of Engineering in 2011 for contributions to the design of trustworthy and secure computer systems.

In 1996, Schneider was named Professor-at-Large at the University of Tromsø, Norway. In 2003, he was awarded an honorary DSc degree by Newcastle University in the United Kingdom.

He was named as the recipient of the IEEE Emanuel R. Piore Award for 2012.

In 2018 he and Bowen Alpern received the Dijkstra Prize for their 1985 paper "Defining liveness".

== Awards ==
- Fellow, American Association for Advancement of Science (1992)
- Fellow, ACM (1995)
- Professor-at-Large, University of Tromsø, Tromsø, Norway (1996)
- Doctor of Science (honoris causa), University of Newcastle, U.K. (May 2003), statement read by orator
- ACM SIGOPS Hall of Fame Award (2007)
- Fellow, Institute of Electrical and Electronics Engineers (2008)
- Member, Norwegian Academy of Technological Sciences (2010)
- Member, National Academy of Engineering (2011)
- IEEE Emanuel R. Piore Award (2012)
- Service to Computing Research Association Award (2016)
- Jean-Claude Laprie Award in Dependable Computing (2017)
- Member, American Academy of Arts and Sciences (2017)
- Edsger W. Dijkstra Prize in Distributed Computing (2018)
- IEEE Computer Security Foundations Symposium Distinguished Paper (2021)

== Books ==
- A Logical Approach to Discrete Math. New York: Springer-Verlag, 1993. (With David Gries.)
- On Concurrent Programming. New York: Springer-Verlag, 1997.
- Trust in Cyberspace, National Academy Press, 1998. (Editor.)
