= Hoard memory allocator =

Memory allocator

Hoard
- Original authors: Emery Berger, Kathryn S. McKinley, Robert D. Blumofe, Paul R. Wilson
- Developer: Emery Berger
- Release: September 29, 1999
- Stable release: 3.13 / January 1, 2019; 7 years ago
- Operating system: Linux, OS X, Microsoft Windows
- Available in: C++
- Type: Memory allocation
- License: Apache License v2
- Website: hoard.org
- Repository: github.com/emeryberger/Hoard

The Hoard memory allocator, or Hoard, is a memory allocator for Linux, OS X, and Microsoft Windows. Hoard is designed to be efficient when used by multithreaded applications on multiprocessor computers. Hoard is distributed under the Apache License, version 2.0.

== History ==
In 2000, its author Emery Berger benchmarked some famous memory allocators and stated Hoard improves the performance of multithreaded applications by providing fast, scalable memory management functions (malloc and free). In particular, it reduces contention for the heap (the central data structure used in dynamic memory allocation) caused when multiple threads allocate or free memory, and avoids the false sharing that can be introduced by memory allocators. At the same time, Hoard has strict bounds on fragmentation.

Hoard continues to be maintained and improved, and is in use by a number of open source and commercial projects.

It has also inspired changes to other memory allocators such as the one in OS X since February 2008 (first released in Mac OS X Snow Leopard).

== See also ==
- C dynamic memory allocation – Dynamic memory management in the C programming language
- Manual memory management – Computer memory management methodology
- Dynamic memory allocation – Computer memory management methodology
- mimalloc – Microsoft open source library
