= Nominative and structural type systems =

Nominative and structural type systems are:

- Nominative type system
- Structural type system

The differences between nominative and structural type systems are discussed in:

- Type system
- Subtyping
