= History of Programming Languages (conference) =

U.S. scientific conference

History of Programming Languages (HOPL) is an infrequent ACM SIGPLAN conference. It has been held in 1978, 1993, 2007, and 2021.

== HOPL I ==
HOPL I was held June 1–3, 1978 in Los Angeles, California. Jean E. Sammet was both the general and program committee chair. John A. N. Lee was the administrative chair. Richard L. Wexelblat was the proceedings chair. Grace Hopper gave the keynote speech. From Sammet's introduction: The HOPL Conference "is intended to consider the technical factors which influenced the development of certain selected programming languages." The languages and presentations in the first HOPL were by invitation of the program committee. The invited languages must have been created and in use by 1967. They also must have remained in use in 1977. Finally, they must have had considerable influence on the field of computing.

The papers and presentations went through extensive review by the program committee (and revisions by the authors), far beyond the norm for conferences and commensurate with some of the best journals in the field.

Preprints of the proceedings were published in SIGPLAN Notices. The final proceedings, including transcripts of question and answer sessions, was published as a book titled History of Programming Languages.

== HOPL II ==
HOPL II was held April 20–23, 1993 in Cambridge, Massachusetts. John A. N. Lee was the conference chair and Sammet again was the program chair. In contrast to HOPL I, HOPL II included both invited papers and papers submitted in response to an open call. The scope also expanded. Where HOPL I had only papers on the early history of languages, HOPL II solicited contributions on:

- early history of specific languages
- evolution of a language
- history of language features and concepts
- classes of languages for application-oriented languages and paradigm-oriented languages

The submitted and invited languages must have been documented by 1982. They also must have been in use or taught by 1985.

As in HOPL I, there was a rigorous multi-stage review and revision process.

Preprints of the proceedings were published in SIGPLAN Notices. The final proceedings, including copies of the presentations and transcripts of question and answer sessions, was published as the book titled History of Programming Languages II.

== HOPL III ==
HOPL III was held June 9–10, 2007 in San Diego, California. Brent Hailpern and Barbara G. Ryder were the conference co-chairs. HOPL III had an open call for participation and asked for papers on either the early history or the evolution of programming languages. The languages must have come into existence before 1996 and been widely used since 1998, either commercially or within a specific domain. Research languages that had a great influence on subsequent languages were also candidates for submission.

As with HOPL I and HOPL II, the papers were managed with a multiple stage review/revision process.

The HOPL III languages can be broadly categorized into five classes (or paradigms): Object-oriented (Modula-2, Oberon, C++, Self, Emerald, BETA), Functional (Haskell), Scripting (AppleScript, Lua), Reactive (Erlang, Statecharts), and Parallel (ZPL, High Performance Fortran). Each HOPL III paper describes the perspective of the creators of the language.

The published proceedings include conference videos, presentation materials and a memorial to conference participant Ken Kennedy.

== HOPL IV ==
HOPL IV was held virtually on June 20–22, 2021 (it was postponed from 2020 due to the COVID-19 pandemic). The conference co-chairs were Guy L. Steele Jr. and Richard P. Gabriel. The languages covered in this conference had to be widely adopted by 2011.

The papers, along with two appendices on HOPL IV and a short index of authors, were published in June 2020 in a special edition of the Proceedings of the ACM on Programming Languages with Gabriel and Steele as associate editors. The papers (without the appendices or author index or the PACMPL edtor's note) are also listed on the ACM's proceedings webpage for HOPL IV.
