= Chimera Linux =

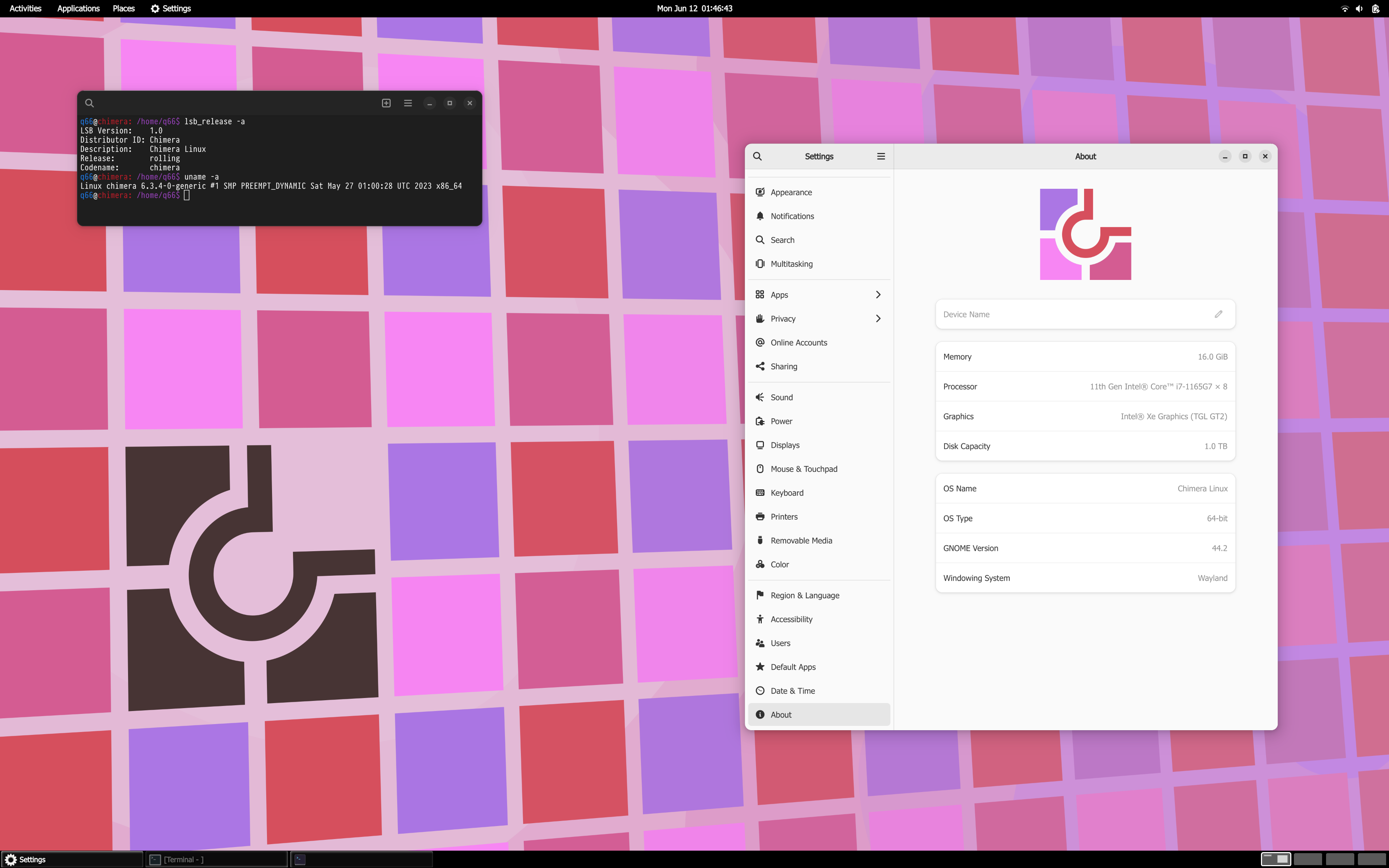
- Screenshot of Chimera Linux with default GNOME 44.2 desktop environment
- Developer: Chimera Linux developers
- OS family: Linux with a BSD-flavored userland (Unix-like)
- Working state: Current
- Source model: Open source
- Latest release: Rolling release / 20 December 2025; 9 months ago
- Repository: https://github.com/chimera-linux/
- Marketing target: General purpose
- Update method: Rolling release
- Package manager: apk-tools
- Supported platforms: x86-64, aarch64, loongarch64, ppc64le, RISC-V
- Kernel type: Monolithic (Linux)
- Userland: BSD
- Default user interface: GNOME Shell, FreeBSD's Almquist shell
- Official website: chimera-linux.org

Chimera Linux is an independent (i.e. has no upstream), general-purpose, rolling-release Linux distribution.

Its core feature is a system design approach based on alternative, modular software. It also aims for reproducible system configuration.

== Design principles and architecture ==
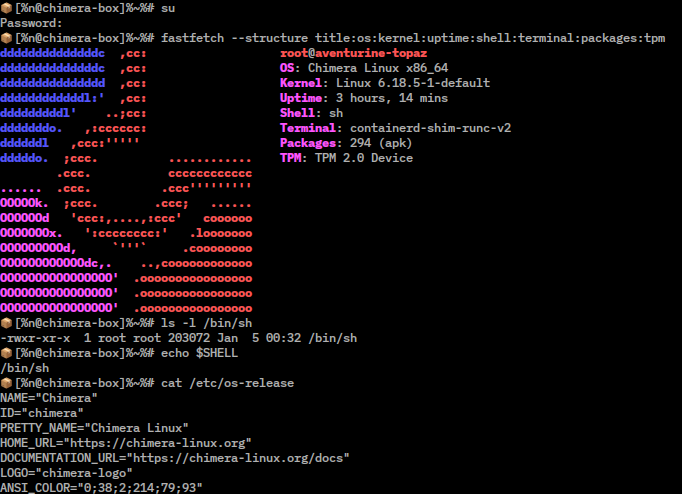
Chimera Linux running inside Distrobox, showing the FreeBSD Almquist shell

The defining feature of Chimera Linux is a set of choices about system components that deviate from traditional Linux distributions. The developers aim to make Chimera Linux leaner without limiting its functionality. The original developer q66 (Nina Kolesová) wishes "to achieve 90 percent of the outcome with just 10 percent of the complexity." In selecting components, particular attention is paid to code quality and the correctness of their implementation.

A core aspect of this approach is that the individual system components and their integration into a complete operating system are holistic rather than isolated. By doing so, Chimera Linux avoids the classic chicken or the egg problem common in core system development: whether a new component shall be adapted to an existing system, or an existing system shall be reshaped to accommodate a new component.

This design philosophy results in the following technical choices:

- LLVM with Clang as the primary toolchain, instead of GCC
- musl as the system C library, replacing glibc
- mimalloc as the memory allocator, as musl's allocator is regarded as somewhat slow
- Dinit as the init system, instead of systemd
- FreeBSD userland tools, rather than GNU coreutils
- turnstile, a work in progress effort to create a session/login tracker to serve as a fully-featured alternative to the logind subproject from systemd, alongside other tooling made for the distribution
- Alpine Package Keeper v3 for software compiled for Chimera Linux

Chimera has a strict default security model, employing the in-development Dinit init system and the FreeBSD userland as some of the more radical approaches. Such choices would have been a difficult migration for a distribution with an existing user base.

By combining the Linux kernel with a BSD-derived userland and non-GNU core components, Chimera Linux provides an alternative leaner and cleaner implementation of the Linux OS architecture while remaining compatible with existing Linux software. Together with the LLVM toolchain, this distribution provides an alternative to the common GNU-based systems, without explicitly excluding GNU tools or GPL licensed software in general.

Chimera Linux follows a rolling release model.

=== chimerautils ===
chimerautils
- Developer: Chimera Linux
- Stable release: 15.0.3 / 4th January 2026
- Written in: C, roff, shell script, Meson, Yacc, C++
- Operating system: Unix-like
- Type: Miscellaneous utilities
- License: mostly BSD-2-Clause
- Website: github.com/chimera-linux/chimerautils

chimerautils is Chimera Linux's userland utility suite that replaces the GNU coreutils and several other userland utilities used on most other distributions. Its upstream is FreeBSD's coreutils and its version number corresponds to the versioning of FreeBSD releases. The tools from FreeBSD are complemented with utilities added by Chimera. The chimerautils can also be regarded as an alternative to BusyBox and other solutions like uutils. chimerautils has been packaged also for the Alpine Linux testing branch.

=== Package management ===
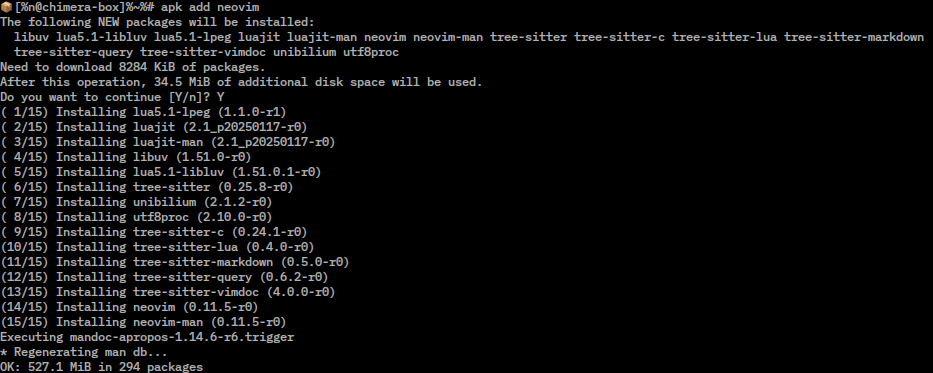
Alpine Package Manager (apk) installing neovim

==== APK and cports ====
Native software for Chimera Linux is distributed exclusively using APKv3 (Alpine Package Keeper 3 a.k.a. apk-tools) from Alpine Linux. Nonetheless, Chimera does not re-use Alpine packages. Rather, it uses its own novel Python-based package build system called cports, which was inspired by Void Linux's xbps-src and initially to a lesser extent by Alpine Linux's abuild.

As of March 2025, Chimera Linux was already using APKv3, at a time when this version was not yet adopted by Alpine Linux itself.

==== Flatpak ====
Because Chimera Linux uses musl instead of glibc, some proprietary and closed-source applications that assume glibc compatibility cannot run without additional measures. To address this limitation, Flatpak is included in the distribution.

Flatpak allows applications to bundle their required runtime libraries and run in a sandboxed environment, making proprietary software such as Steam available on Chimera Linux.

=== Desktop environments ===
As of January 2026, the Chimera Linux repositories provide the following desktop environments:

- GNOME (official live image available)
- KDE Plasma (official live image available)
- Xfce
- Enlightenment

== History ==
Chimera Linux was started in 2021 by former Void Linux maintainer “q66”.

The project entered its alpha stage on 11 June 2023, marking the point at which it considered itself suitable for early adopters, with a more stable infrastructure and expanding repositories.

The beta phase began on 27 December 2024, when its package management tools were tagged as release candidates.

Live image version 20251220 introduced a text-based installer.
