= John Whaley =

John Whaley may refer to:

- John Corey Whaley, American author
- John Whaley (MP), MP for New Shoreham
- John Whaley (fl. 1841), High Sheriff of Armagh
- John Whaley (computer scientist), American computer scientist and co-founder of Moka5

== See also ==
- John Whalley (disambiguation)
