= John Whaley (computer scientist) =

American computer scientist, entrepreneur, and investor

- Whaley at TechCrunch Disrupt in 2016
- Born: John Craig Whaley
- Education: Massachusetts Institute of Technology (BS, MEng); Stanford University (PhD)
- Known for: Context-sensitive pointer analysis; Joeq; bddbddb; co-founding Moka5, UnifyID, and Inception Studio
- Awards: OOPSLA Best Paper Award (2001); ACM SIGSOFT Distinguished Paper Award (2002); PLDI Best Paper Award (2004); Arthur L. Samuel Thesis Award (2007); SIGPLAN Programming Languages Software Award (2012, Jikes RVM); Forbes AI 50 (2021, UnifyID)
- Scientific career
- Fields: Computer science, program analysis, compilers, cybersecurity
- Workplaces: Stanford University
- Thesis: Context-Sensitive Pointer Analysis using Binary Decision Diagrams (2007)
- Doctoral advisor: Monica S. Lam

John Craig Whaley is an American computer scientist, entrepreneur, and investor. He is known for research in program analysis and compilers, particularly context-sensitive pointer analysis using binary decision diagrams, and for co-founding the companies Moka5 and UnifyID. He later served as CEO of the cybersecurity company Redcoat AI and co-founded Inception Studio, a nonprofit accelerator, as well as Inception Studio Capital. He is an adjunct lecturer in computer science at Stanford University.

== Education and research ==
Whaley received a B.S. in computer science and engineering and an M.Eng. from MIT in 1999. He worked at IBM's Thomas J. Watson Research Center on the Jalapeño Java virtual machine (later known as Jikes RVM) and at IBM's Tokyo Research Laboratory.

He completed his Ph.D. at Stanford in 2007 under Monica S. Lam. His dissertation, Context-Sensitive Pointer Analysis using Binary Decision Diagrams, received the department's Arthur L. Samuel Thesis Award. While at Stanford he developed Joeq, an open-source virtual machine and compiler infrastructure, and bddbddb, a system that translates Datalog program analyses into efficient binary decision diagram implementations.

His 2004 paper with Lam, "Cloning-Based Context-Sensitive Pointer Alias Analysis Using Binary Decision Diagrams," won the best paper award at PLDI. As of November 2026, it has been cited more than 840 times according to Google Scholar. A 1999 paper on compositional pointer and escape analysis has over 570 citations. He also received a Best Paper Award at OOPSLA in 2001 and an ACM SIGSOFT Distinguished Paper Award in 2002.

== Moka5 ==
In 2005 Whaley co-founded Moka5 (also styled MokaFive) with Monica Lam and Stanford researchers Ramesh Chandra and Constantine Sapuntzakis. The company commercialized desktop virtualization research from Stanford. Whaley served as chief technology officer.

== UnifyID ==
Whaley co-founded UnifyID with Kurt Somerville. The company developed implicit authentication based on behavioral signals such as device usage, location, gait, and typing patterns. UnifyID was runner-up in the Startup Battlefield at TechCrunch Disrupt San Francisco in 2016 and won the Innovation Sandbox contest at the RSA Conference the following year. In August 2017 it raised a $20 million Series A led by NEA. UnifyID was named to the Forbes AI 50 list in 2021.

Prove agreed to acquire UnifyID in June 2021. Whaley remained with the company afterward as senior vice president of emerging products.

== Inception Studio ==
Inception Studio is a nonprofit accelerator Whaley launched in 2022 with Mike Morris. It organizes short residential programs for experienced founders and is supported by sponsorships and donations. Whaley is also co-founder and managing partner of Inception Studio Capital, an affiliated venture fund.

== Redcoat AI ==
In March 2024 Redcoat AI, a cybersecurity company focused on defenses against AI-assisted social engineering, emerged from stealth with $4.24 million in funding led by Pear VC. Whaley was CEO. The company originated at Inception Studio. Redcoat AI was later acquired by Textla.

== Teaching ==
Whaley has taught CS243 (Program Analysis and Optimizations) at Stanford and teaches CS 224G (Apps With LLMs Inside).

== Awards ==
- Best Paper Award, OOPSLA 2001, for "Partial Method Compilation using Dynamic Profile Information"
- ACM SIGSOFT Distinguished Paper Award, 2002, for "Automatic Extraction of Object-Oriented Component Interfaces"
- Best Paper Award, PLDI 2004, for "Cloning-Based Context-Sensitive Pointer Alias Analysis Using Binary Decision Diagrams"
- Arthur L. Samuel Thesis Award, Stanford University, 2007
- ACM SIGPLAN Programming Languages Software Award, 2012, as one of 32 named contributors to Jikes RVM
- Forbes AI 50, 2021 (UnifyID)

== Selected publications ==
- Whaley, John; Rinard, Martin (1999). "Compositional Pointer and Escape Analysis for Java Programs". Proceedings of the 14th ACM SIGPLAN Conference on Object-Oriented Programming, Systems, Languages, and Applications. pp. 187–206. doi:10.1145/320384.320400.
- Whaley, John (2001). "Partial Method Compilation using Dynamic Profile Information". Proceedings of the 16th ACM SIGPLAN Conference on Object-Oriented Programming, Systems, Languages, and Applications. pp. 166–179. doi:10.1145/504282.504295.
- Whaley, John; Martin, Michael C.; Lam, Monica S. (2002). "Automatic Extraction of Object-Oriented Component Interfaces". Proceedings of the 2002 ACM SIGSOFT International Symposium on Software Testing and Analysis. pp. 218–228. doi:10.1145/566172.566212.
- Whaley, John; Lam, Monica S. (2004). "Cloning-Based Context-Sensitive Pointer Alias Analysis Using Binary Decision Diagrams". Proceedings of the ACM SIGPLAN 2004 Conference on Programming Language Design and Implementation. pp. 131–144. doi:10.1145/996841.996859.
- Naik, Mayur; Aiken, Alex; Whaley, John (2006). "Effective Static Race Detection for Java". Proceedings of the 27th ACM SIGPLAN Conference on Programming Language Design and Implementation. pp. 308–319. doi:10.1145/1133981.1134018.
