= Laurie Hendren =

Canadian computer scientist (1958–2019)

Laurie Jane Hendren
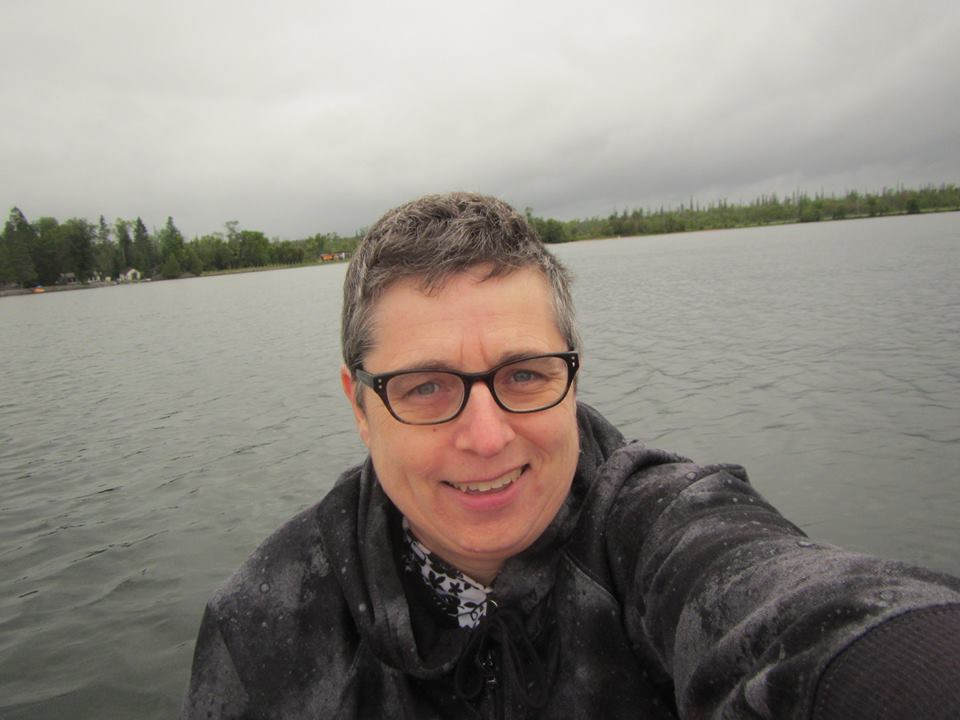
- Kayaking at Chandos Lake, Summer 2014
- Born: December 13, 1958; Peterborough, Ontario, Canada
- Died: May 27, 2019 (aged 60); Montreal, Quebec, Canada
- Education: Queen's University, Kingston; Cornell University
- Known for: Programming languages Compiler research Pointer analysis
- Spouse: Prakash Panangaden
- Awards: Leo Yaffe Award for Excellence in Teaching (2005–2006); ACM Fellow (2009); Canada Research Chair (2011); Fellow of the Royal Society of Canada (2012)
- Scientific career
- Fields: Computer science
- Workplaces: McGill University
- Doctoral advisor: Alex Nicolau
- Website: www.sable.mcgill.ca/~hendren flatchestedwarriors.weebly.com

Laurie Hendren FRSC (December 13, 1958 – May 27, 2019) was a Canadian computer scientist noted for her research in programming languages and compilers, and for her advocacy for patients to have access to their health data in Quebec.

== Biography ==
Hendren received a B.Sc. and M.Sc. in computer science from Queen's University, Kingston in 1982 and 1984 respectively. She received a Ph.D in computer science from Cornell University in 1990.

She then joined the School of Computer Science at the McGill University as an assistant professor in 1990. While there she was promoted to associate professor in 1995 and full professor in 2001. She also served as Associate Dean (Academic) for the Faculty of Science at McGill University from 2005 to 2014. In 2014, she became the 5 of diamonds in the Notable Women of Computing card deck.

== Awards and notable achievements ==
Hendren was awarded the Leo Yaffe Award for Excellence in Teaching in the Faculty of Science at McGill University for the academic year 2006–2007. She was made an ACM Fellow in 2009, awarded a Canada Research Chair in 2011, and elected as a fellow of the Royal Society of Canada in 2012.

Hendren was the programming languages area editor of the Association for Computing Machinery books series and has been the program chair of the Association for Computing Machinery SIGPLAN Programming Language Design and Implementation Conference.

In 2019, Hendren was awarded the senior AITO Dahl-Nygaard Prize, but died before the ECOOP conference at which the prize is usually awarded. It was thus awarded posthumously.

== Research projects ==
Hendren has led or co-led several big open source research projects at McGill University. These are:

- Soot: a framework for analyzing and transforming Java and Android Applications
- SableVM: an open implementation of a Java virtual machine
- abc: the AspectBench Compiler for AspectJ
- McLab: compiler tools for array-based languages
- OHIG: The Opal Health Informatics Group that built and operated the Opal patient portal, the first patient portal in a hospital in Quebec
