= Stephanie Weirich =

American computer scientist

Stephanie Weirich (/ˈwaɪərɪk/ WYRE-ik) is an American computer scientist specializing in type theory, type inference, dependent types, and functional programming. She is a professor of computer science at the University of Pennsylvania.

== Education and career ==
Weirich graduated magna cum laude in 1996 from Rice University, with a bachelor's degree in computer science. At Rice, she became interested in programming languages through an undergraduate research project with Matthias Felleisen. She moved to Cornell University for her graduate studies, completing her Ph.D. in 2002. Her dissertation, Programming with Types, was supervised by Greg Morrisett. She joined the University of Pennsylvania faculty in 2002.

== Recognition ==
Weirich won the SIGPLAN Robin Milner Young Researcher Award in 2016. She was named as an ACM Fellow, in the 2025 class of fellows, "for contributions to static type systems and mechanized mathematics of programming languages".
