= Julia Lawall =

Computer scientist

Julia Lawall is a computer scientist specializing in programming languages. Educated in the US, she has worked in the US, Denmark, and France, where she is a director of research for Inria. She is one of the developers of Coccinelle, a tool for finding patterns and making systematic transformations of source code, and she has also done research on domain-specific languages for operating systems.

== Education and career ==
Lawall majored in mathematics at Oberlin College (Ohio), graduating in 1986, and began her graduate studies in computer science at Carnegie Mellon University. She has a Ph.D. from Indiana University Bloomington, completed in 1994. Her dissertation, Continuation Introduction and Elimination in Higher-Order Programming Languages, was jointly supervised by Daniel P. Friedman and Olivier Danvy.

After completing her doctorate, she worked with Harry Mairson in the Logic and Computation group at Brandeis University in Boston, and at the Research Institute of Computer Science and Random Systems (IRISA) in Rennes, France, before taking a faculty position in the Department of Computer Science (DIKU) of the University of Copenhagen. She moved from Copenhagen to the French Institute for Research in Computer Science and Automation (Inria) in 2011; at Inria, she directs the Whisper project (well-honed infrastructure software for programming environments and runtimes). She also held an affiliation with the Laboratoire d'Informatique de Paris 6 of Sorbonne University from 2013 to 2020.

On December 21, 2025, she was elected to the Linux Foundation Technical Advisory Board.

== Recognition ==
Lawall has won two test-of-time awards for her publications. Her paper with Harry Mairson, "Optimality and inefficiency: what isn’t a cost model of the lambda calculus?", on the optimization criteria for finding normal forms in the lambda calculus, won the inaugural Most Influential ICFP Paper Award of ACM SIGPLAN, ten years after its publication in 1996. Additionally, her paper "Documenting and automating collateral evolutions in linux device drivers" (with Yoann Padioleau, René Rydhof Hansen, and Gilles Muller, in EuroSys 2008) won the 2018 EuroSys Test-of-Time Award. The paper introduced Coccinelle and described its use in maintaining device drivers to keep them synchronized with operating system changes.
