= Robert Harper (computer scientist) =

Computer scientist

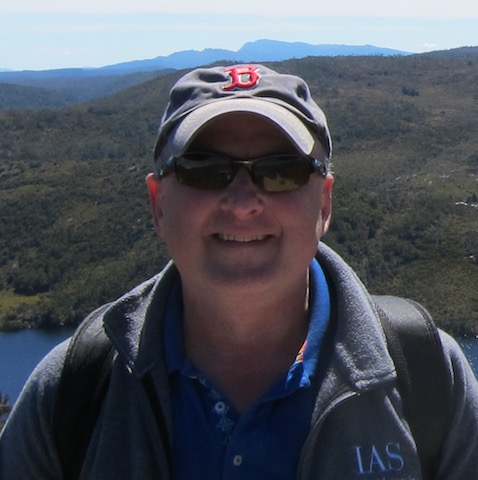
- Robert Harper in 2012
- Born: Robert William Harper, Jr. July 15, 1957 (age 69)
- Other name: Bob Harper
- Education: M.Sc.; Cornell University (1983); Ph.D.; Cornell University (1985)
- Known for: Standard ML; LF logical framework; Type theory; Functional programming
- Awards: ACM Fellow, 2005; ACM SIGPLAN Most Influential PLDI Paper, 2006; LICS Test of Time Award, 2007; ACM SIGPLAN Prog Lang Achievement Award, 2021
- Scientific career
- Fields: Computer science
- Workplaces: University of Edinburgh; Carnegie Mellon
- Doctoral students: Benjamin Pierce; Greg Morrisett; Tom Murphy
- Website: www.cs.cmu.edu/~rwh/

Robert William Harper, Jr. (born 1957) is a computer science professor at Carnegie Mellon University who works in programming language research. Prior to his position at Carnegie Mellon, Harper was a research fellow at the University of Edinburgh.

== Career ==
Harper made major contributions to the design of the Standard ML programming language and the LF logical framework.

Harper was named an ACM Fellow in 2005 for his contributions to type systems for programming languages. In 2021, he received the ACM SIGPLAN Programming Languages Achievement Award for his "foundational contributions to our understanding of type theory and its use in the design, specification, implementation, and verification of modern programming languages".

== Awards ==
- Herbert A. Simon Award for Teaching Excellence in Computer Science, CMU.
- Allen Newell Award for Research Excellence, CMU. for research on type-directed compilation. (Note: The research for which this award was given resulted in Greg Morrisett's Ph.D. thesis, with Harper as co-advisor, a paper by Morrisett and Harper, and a few other publications.) (2001)
- ACM Fellow, for contributions to type systems. (2005)
- ACM SIGPLAN Most Influential PLDI Paper Award, for the paper TIL: a type-directed optimizing compiler for ML. (2006)
- LICS Test-of-Time Award Winner, for the paper A Framework for defining logics. (2007)
- ACM SIGPLAN Programming Languages Achievement Award, for foundational contributions to type theory and its use. (2021)

== Books ==
- Robin Milner, Mads Tofte, Robert Harper, and David MacQueen. The Definition of Standard ML (Revised). MIT Press, 1997.
- Robert Harper (editor). Types in Compilation. Springer-Verlag Lecture Notes in Computer Science, volume 2071, 2001.
- Robert Harper. Type Systems for Programming Languages. Draft, 2000.
- Robert Harper. Programming in Standard ML. Working Draft, 2013.
- Robert Harper. Practical Foundations for Programming Languages, 2007 draft. 2nd edition: ISBN 1107150302, 2016.

== Personal life ==
In 2003–2008, Harper hosted the progressive talk show Left Out on WRCT-FM with fellow host and Carnegie Mellon University School of Computer Science faculty member Danny Sleator.
