= George Necula =

Romanian computer scientist

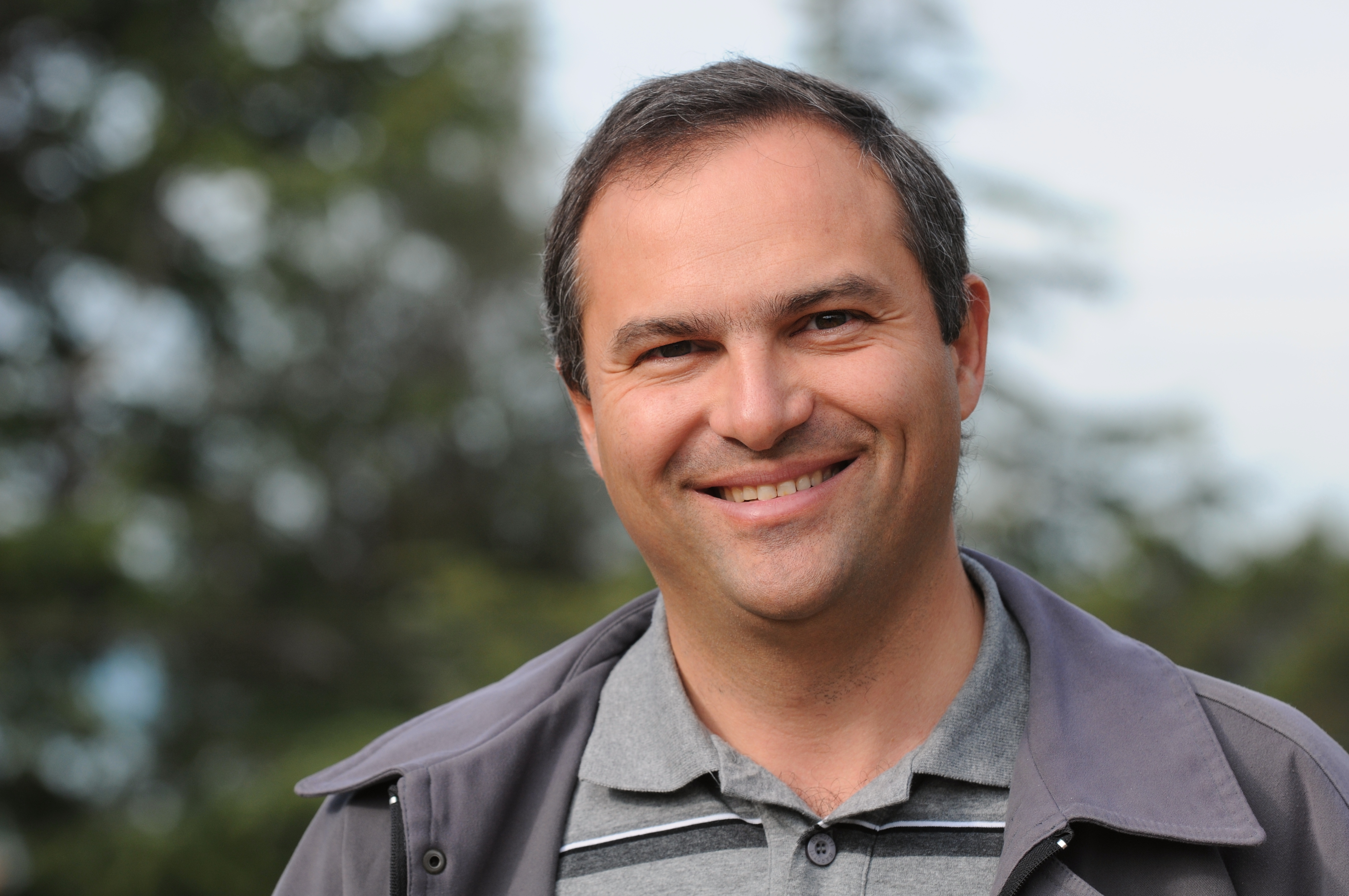
- Necula in Berkeley in 2010
- Education: Polytechnic University of Bucharest
- Known for: Proof-carrying code
- Scientific career
- Fields: Computer Science
- Workplaces: Google
- Doctoral advisor: Peter Lee

George Ciprian Necula is a Romanian computer scientist, engineer at Google, and former professor at the University of California, Berkeley who does research in the area of programming languages and software engineering, with a particular focus on software verification and formal methods. He is best known for his Ph.D. thesis work first describing proof-carrying code, a work that received the 2007 SIGPLAN Most Influential POPL Paper Award.

== Life and work ==
Originally from Baia Mare, Romania, Necula received a BS in Computer Science (1992) from the Polytechnic University of Bucharest. He then came to Carnegie Mellon University in the United States, completing his MS in Computer Science (1995) and PhD in Computer Science (1998) under programming-languages researcher Peter Lee. His PhD work introduced proof-carrying code, which was influential as a mechanism to allow untrusted machine code to run safely without performance overhead. He joined as faculty at the University of California, Berkeley in 1998.

More recently, Necula's work has focused on open-source analysis, verification, and transformation tools for C, including the C Intermediate Language (CIL), CCured , and Deputy .

=== C Intermediate Language ===
C Intermediate Language (CIL) is a simplified subset of the C programming language, as well as a set of tools for transforming C programs into that language. Several other tools use CIL as a way to have access to a C abstract syntax tree. One of these programs is Frama-C (Framework to Analyze C programs).

== Awards ==
Necula is a Fellow of the Okawa Foundation and the Alfred P. Sloan Foundation (see Sloan Fellowship). He received the Grace Murray Hopper Award in 2001, the National Science Foundation CAREER Award in 1999, and the ACM SIGOPS Hall of Fame Award in 2006. In 2016, he became an ACM Distinguished Member.
