= John Whalley =

John Whalley may refer to:

- John Whalley (MP) (1633–?), 17th-century English politician
- John Whalley (theologian) (1699–1748), English clergyman and academic
- John Whalley (cricketer) (1872–1925), Australian cricketer
- J. Irving Whalley (1902–1980), American politician
- John Whalley (economist) (born 1947), Canadian economist

== See also ==
- John Walley (died 1615), English politician
- John Whaley (disambiguation)
