= Kathryn S. McKinley =

American computer scientist

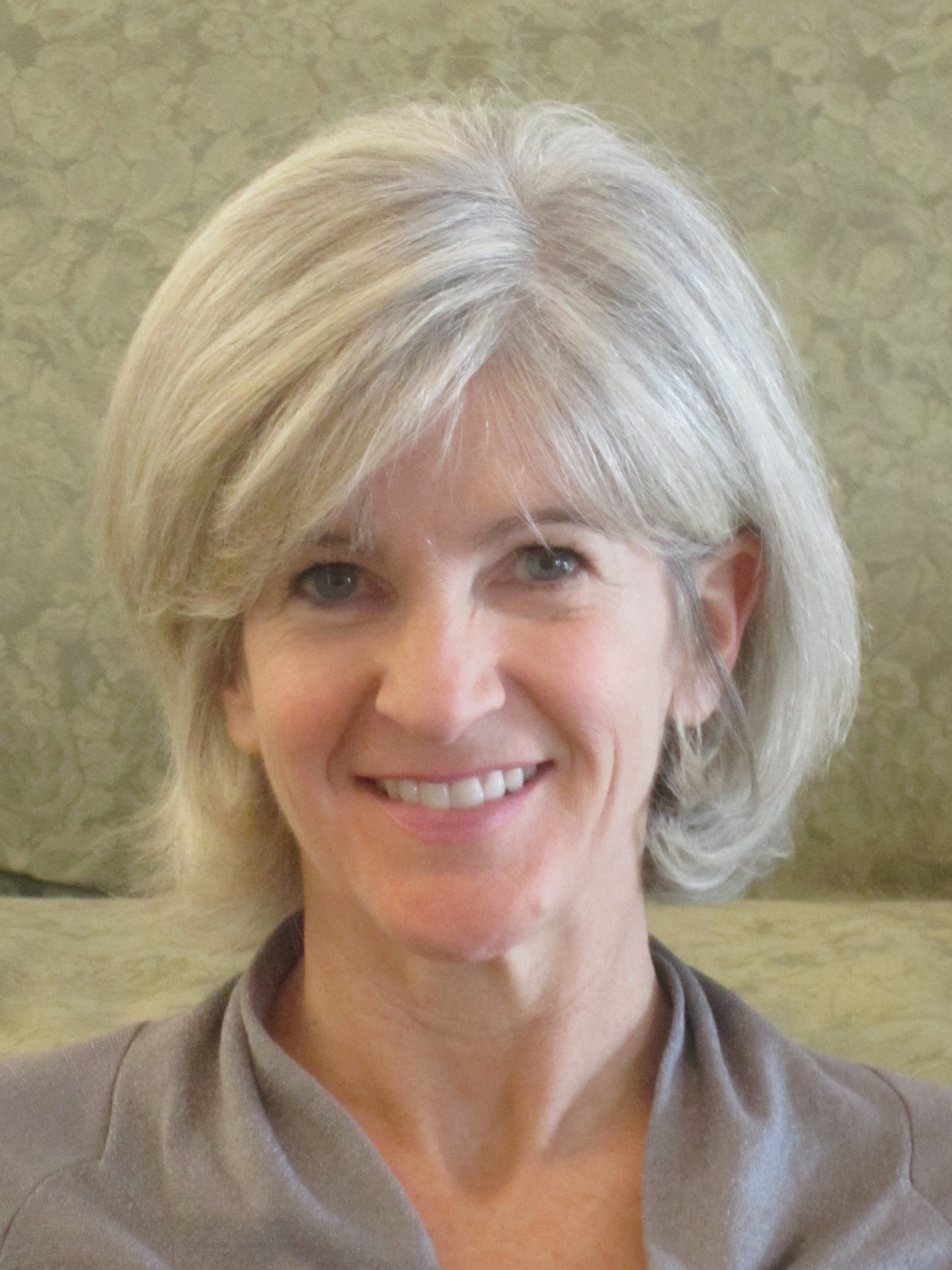
- Kathryn S. McKinley
- Born: January 10, 1962 (age 64); Owensboro, Kentucky, US
- Education: Rice University
- Known for: Locality & Parallelism Optimizations Hoard memory allocator DaCapo Java Benchmarks; Immix Mark-Region Garbage Collector TRIPS compiler
- Awards: ACM Fellow (2008); IEEE Fellow (2011)
- Scientific career
- Fields: Computer Science
- Workplaces: Microsoft; The University of Texas at Austin; University of Massachusetts Amherst
- Doctoral advisor: Ken Kennedy
- Website: www.cs.utexas.edu/~mckinley/

Kathryn S. McKinley is an American computer scientist noted for her research on compilers, runtime systems, and computer architecture. She is also known for her leadership in broadening participation in computing. McKinley was co-chair of CRA-W from 2011 to 2014.

== Biography ==
McKinley received a B.A. in computer science and engineering from Rice University in 1985. She went on to earn an M.S. in computer science from Rice University in 1990 and then a Ph.D in computer science from Rice University in 1992.

She joined the Department of Computer Science at the University of Massachusetts Amherst as an assistant professor in 1993. While there she was promoted to associate professor in 1999. In 2001, she moved to the University of Texas at Austin as an associate professor. In 2005, she was promoted to professor and in 2010 to endowed professor in computer science. In 2011 she moved to Microsoft Research as a Principal Researcher. She is currently a Distinguished Software Engineer at Google.

McKinley is married to Scotty Strahan; they have three boys: Cooper, Dylan, and Wyatt Strahan.

== Career ==
She and her colleagues introduced the first general-purpose model and optimization framework based on dependences and cache line reuse for improving the cache locality of dense matrix algorithms using loop permutation, loop reversal, fusion, and distribution. McKinley and her advisor, Ken Kennedy showed how to use this model to introduce parallelism with locality and eliminate false sharing. This work was selected in 2014 for the ICS 25th Anniversary Volume.

McKinley, her PhD student Emery D. Berger, and colleagues introduced the Hoard C/C++ Memory Allocator, which is widely used by applications and in Apple's OS X. Hoard limits contention caused when multiple threads allocate or free memory at the same time and avoids false sharing due to memory allocation. At the same time, Hoard enforces provable bounds on the total amount of fragmentation.

McKinley was a leader of the DaCapo research group, which spanned nine institutions and was funded by an NSF ITR (2000–2006). This project produced a number of innovative virtual machine technologies, open-source tools, open-source benchmarks, and new methodologies for evaluating managed runtimes. The benchmarking and methodologies efforts were led by Stephen M. Blackburn. The DaCapo Java benchmark suite and evaluation methodologies are widely used in academia and industry to evaluate Java analysis, optimization, and testing technologies. Blackburn, Cheng, and McKinley were the first to perform an apples-to-apples comparison of garbage collection algorithms that showed free-list allocators give up substantial amounts of locality even though they require less memory compared to copying algorithms, which allocate contemporaneous objects contiguously. This work won the SIGMETRICS 2014 Test of Time of Award.

Based on this insight, Blackburn and McKinley designed a new class of garbage collectors, which named mark-region. Their Immix mark-region collector manages memory hierarchically using fixed sized blocks consisting of lines. Contiguous object allocation may cross lines, but noblocks. Immix collection mixes line marking and object copying in a single pass. This design delivers substantial performance benefits due to smaller heap footprints and improvements in locality.

Her PhD student Michael Bond received the ACM SIGPLAN Outstanding Doctoral Dissertation Award in 2008.

On February 14, 2013, McKinley testified to the House Committee on Science, Space, and Technology, at the Subcommittee on Research. She spoke on the academic, industry, and government computing research ecosystem that is driving innovation and economic advances in almost all fields.

== Awards ==
In 2008 she was named an ACM Fellow. She was elected to the American Academy of Arts and Sciences in 2023.

Her other notable awards include:

- ACM SIGPLAN Programming Languages Achievement Award, seminal contributions to parallelizing compilers, parallel systems, and memory management; and her leadership and service, 2023.
- ACM SIGMETRICS Test of Time Award in 2014
- Most Influential OOPSLA Paper Award from 2002, awarded in 2012. Berger, E. D.; Zorn, B. G.; McKinley, K. S. (November 2002). "Reconsidering Custom Memory Allocation" (PDF). Proceedings of the 17th ACM SIGPLAN conference on Object-oriented programming, systems, languages, and applications. OOPSLA '02. pp. 1–12. doi:10.1145/582419.582421. ISBN 978-1-58113-471-1. S2CID 481812.
- IEEE Fellow (2011)
- ACM SIGPLAN Programming Languages Software Award, for Jikes RVM (2012)
- ACM SIGPLAN Distinguished Service Award (2011)
- ACM Distinguished Scientist (2006)
