= Moka5 =

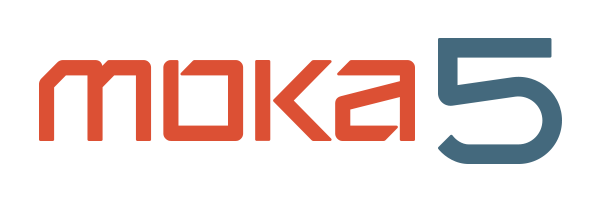
- Type: Private
- Industry: Enterprise software
- Founded: Stanford, CA
- Founder: John Whaley; Monica S. Lam; Ramesh Chandra; Constantine Sapuntzakis
- Headquarters: Redwood City, CA
- Products: Virtual Desktop Management, Desktop Virtualization Tools

Moka5 (also called MokaFive) was a desktop virtualization company founded in 2005. It ceased operation in 2015 after an apparent bankruptcy. The company's software began as a lab experiment at Stanford University and founders include professor Monica S. Lam and John Whaley. It was based out of Redwood City, California and its final CEO was Dave Robbins.

Moka5 provided end-to-end desktop management solutions including client virtualization, central management, and layering solutions. Using the Moka5 Suite, users can run a virtual desktop from consumer devices including tablet computers smartphones. Moka5 offered secure cloud storage for virtual desktops and lets users access multiple computing platforms and operating systems across devices.

== See also ==
- desktop virtualization
- virtual desktop
- enterprise software
