= Mimalloc =

Microsoft open source library

mimalloc
- Original authors: Daan Leijen / Microsoft Research
- Developer: Microsoft
- Initial release: July 2019; 6 years ago
- Stable release: 2.2.7 / 15 January 2026, and 3.2.7 release candidate 2 / 15 January 2026
- Written in: C
- Operating system: Windows, FreeBSD, NetBSD, DragonFly BSD, macOS, Linux
- Type: Software library
- License: MIT License
- Website: microsoft.github.io/mimalloc/
- Repository: github.com/microsoft/mimalloc

mimalloc (pronounced "me-malloc") is a free and open-source compact general-purpose memory allocator developed by Microsoft with focus on performance characteristics. The library is about 11000 lines of code and works as a drop-in replacement for malloc of the C standard library and requires no additional code changes. mimalloc was initially developed for the run-time systems of the Lean and Koka languages. Notable design aspects include free list sharding, eager page reset, and first-class heaps. It can co-exist with other memory allocators linked to the same program. mimalloc is available on Windows, Mac OS X, Linux and *BSD. The source code is licensed under MIT License and available on GitHub.

== See also ==
- C dynamic memory allocation – Dynamic memory management in the C programming language
- Manual memory management – Computer memory management methodology
- Dynamic memory allocation – Computer memory management methodology
- Hoard memory allocator – Memory allocator
