= Simon Marlow =

British computer scientist

- Education: University of Glasgow; University of Bristol
- Known for: Glasgow Haskell Compiler
- Awards: SIGPLAN Programming Languages Software Award (2011)
- Scientific career
- Fields: Computer science
- Institutions: Microsoft Research; Facebook, Meta Platforms (London)

Simon Marlow is a British computer scientist, programmer, author, and co-developer of the Glasgow Haskell Compiler (GHC) for the programming language Haskell. He and Simon Peyton Jones won the SIGPLAN Programming Languages Software Award in 2011 for their work on GHC. Marlow's book Parallel and Concurrent Programming in Haskell was published in July 2013.

Formerly of Microsoft Research, Marlow has worked at Facebook between March 2013 and early 2025. The "noted Haskell guru" is part of the team behind Facebook's open source Haxl project, a Haskell library that simplifies access to remote data, and later "Glean"., a "system for collecting, deriving and querying facts about code".

== Honours and awards ==
In 2011, he and Simon Peyton Jones were awarded the SIGPLAN Programming Languages Software Award for their work on GHC. In 2019, Marlow was awarded the Most Influential ICFP Paper award for "Runtime Support for Multicore Haskell".
