= Mary Hall (computer scientist) =

American computer scientist

Mary Wolcott Hall is an American computer scientist specializing in compilers and automatic parallelization. She is director of the Kahlert School of Computing at the University of Utah.

== Education and career ==
Hall's mother, a mathematics teacher, passed on her interest in computers to her daughter. Hall became an undergraduate at Rice University, originally majoring in computer science and managerial studies but switching to Rice's program in computer science and mathematical sciences, from which she graduated magna cum laude in 1985. She continued at Rice for graduate study in computer science, earning a master's degree in 1989 and completing her Ph.D. in 1991. Her dissertation, Managing Interprocedural Optimization, was supervised by Ken Kennedy. She writes of this time "I only wanted to write a masters thesis and do some research, and I tried to quit twice, but each time Ken Kennedy talked me out of it."

After postdoctoral research at Stanford University, a visiting assistant professorship at the California Institute of Technology, and a research faculty position at the University of Southern California, she obtained a regular-rank associate professorship at the University of Utah in 2008, and was promoted to full professor in 2012.

She was named director of the Kahlert School of Computing in 2020.

== Recognition ==
Hall was named an IEEE Fellow, in the 2020 class of fellows, "for contributions to compiler optimization and performance tuning".
