= Simon Peyton Jones =

British computer scientist (born 1958)

Simon Peyton Jones OBE FRS MAE DFBCS
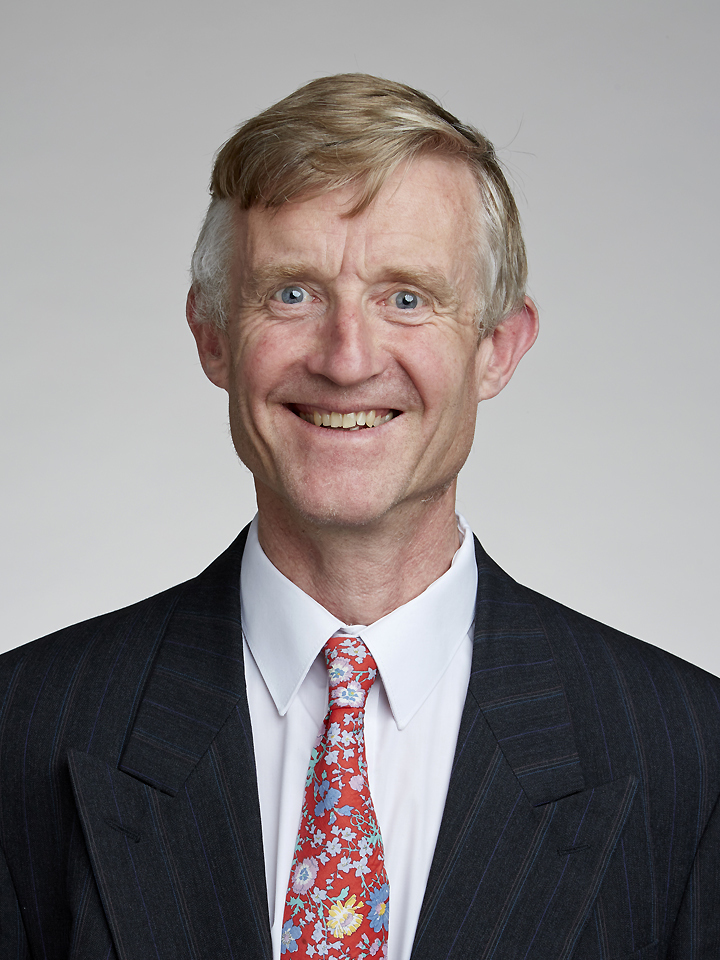
- Peyton Jones in 2016
- Born: 18 January 1958 (age 68); Simon's Town, Cape Town, South Africa
- Citizenship: British
- Education: University of Cambridge (BA, Dipl)
- Known for: Glasgow Haskell Compiler; C--
- Awards: ACM Fellow (2004)
- Scientific career
- Fields: Programming languages; Functional programming
- Workplaces: Epic Games; University College London; University of Glasgow; University of Cambridge; Microsoft Research; Computing At School
- Website: simon.peytonjones.org

Simon Peyton Jones (born 18 January 1958) is a British computer scientist who researches the implementation and applications of functional programming languages, particularly lazy functional programming.

== Education ==
Peyton Jones graduated from the University of Cambridge with a degree in Electrical Sciences in 1979. During this time he was an undergraduate student of Trinity College, Cambridge, and subsequently went on to complete the Cambridge Diploma in Computer Science in 1980. He never did a PhD degree.

== Career and research ==
Peyton Jones worked in industry for two years before serving as a lecturer at University College London and, from 1990 to 1998, as a professor at the University of Glasgow. From 1998 to 2021 he worked as a researcher at Microsoft Research in Cambridge, England. Since 2021 he has worked at Epic Games as an engineering fellow.

He is a major contributor to the design of the Haskell programming language, and a lead developer of the Glasgow Haskell Compiler (GHC). He is also co-creator of the C-- programming language, designed for intermediate program representation between the language-specific front-end of a compiler and a general-purpose back-end code generator and optimiser. C-- is used in GHC.

He was also a major contributor to the 1999 book Cybernauts Awake, which explored the ethical and spiritual implications of the Internet.

Peyton Jones chairs the Computing At School (CAS) group, an organisation which aims to promote the teaching of computer science at school. Following these efforts, in 2019 he was appointed chair of the newly founded UK National Centre for Computing Education.

Peyton Jones has played a vital role in the development of new Microsoft Excel features since 2003, when he published a paper on user-defined functions. In 2021, anonymous functions and let expressions were made available in the Office 365 version of Excel as a beta feature.

=== Honours and awards ===
In 2004 he was inducted as a Fellow of the Association for Computing Machinery for contributions to functional programming languages. In 2011 he was awarded membership in the Academia Europaea (MAE).

In 2011, he and Simon Marlow were awarded the SIGPLAN Programming Languages Software Award for their work on GHC.

He received an honorary doctorate from the University of Glasgow in 2013 and honorary doctorates from the University of Kent and University of Bath in 2017.

He was elected a Fellow of the Royal Society (FRS) in 2016 and a Distinguished Fellow of the British Computer Society (DFBCS) in 2017.

He received the ACM SIGPLAN Programming Languages Achievement Award in 2016 and the ACM SIGPLAN Distinguished Educator Award in 2025.

Peyton Jones was appointed Officer of the Order of the British Empire (OBE) in the 2022 Birthday Honours for services to education and computer science. He also became a Distinguished Affiliate Scholar at Pembroke College, Cambridge, and a Distinguished Honorary Fellow at the University of Cambridge Computer Laboratory.
