= Peter Lee (computer scientist) =

American computer scientist (born 1960)

Peter Lee (born November 30, 1960) is an American computer scientist. He was President and head of Microsoft Research. Previously, he was the head of the Transformational Convergence Technology Office of the Defense Advanced Research Projects Agency and the chair of the Computer Science Department at Carnegie Mellon University. His research focuses on software security and reliability.

Lee received his PhD degree from the University of Michigan in May 1987 with thesis titled The automatic generation of realistic compilers from high-level semantic descriptions. He is a Fellow of the Association for Computing Machinery.

== Career ==
Microsoft Research was founded in 1991.

A longtime "Microsoft Researcher," Peter Lee became the organization's head in 2013. In 2014, the organization had 1,100 advanced researchers "working in 55 areas of study in a dozen labs worldwide." From 2015 to 2020, Lee was the head of Microsoft Research NExT (for New Experiences and Technologies) and Microsoft Healthcare. Since 2020 he leads the combined MSR Labs, AI, NExT, Healthcare, and other incubation efforts. For his initiative to change the medical records-keeping by using AI to summarize the visit summary, Lee was included in Time's 2024 list of 100 most influential people in health.

== Students ==
- Greg Morrisett
- Scott Draves
- George Necula
- Nate Lee (Anthropic)
