= Brent Hailpern =

American computer scientist

- Education: University of Denver, Stanford University
- Occupation: Computer Scientist
- Employer: IBM Research
- Known for: programming languages, concurrency, object-oriented programming
- Title: Director of Computer Science, IBM Research - Almaden

Brent Hailpern is a computer scientist retired from IBM Research. His research work focused on programming languages, software engineering, and concurrency.

== Education ==
Hailpern received his B.S. degree, summa cum laude, in mathematics from the University of Denver (Denver, Colorado) in 1976, and his M.S. and Ph.D. degrees in computer science from Stanford University (Stanford, California) in 1978 and 1980 respectively. His thesis was titled, "Verifying Concurrent Processes Using Temporal Logic".

== Career at IBM ==
Hailpern joined the IBM T. J. Watson Research Center (Yorktown Heights, New York) as a research staff member in 1980. He worked on and managed various projects relating to issues of concurrency and programming languages. In 1987, he founded the Programming Languages and Foundations Department as its senior manager. In 1989, he became the senior manager of Research's Software Environments Department. In 1990, Hailpern joined the Technical Strategy Development Staff in IBM Corporate Headquarters (Armonk, New York) returning to the Research Division in 1991, where he served as senior technical consultant to the Research Division and vice president for systems and software.

In 1992, he became program director and senior manager, Operating Systems Structures Department, where he coordinated the Research Division's joint programs with IBM's AS/400 Division and Personal Software Products Division. The department he managed researched issues of operating systems principles, file systems, and multimedia servers. In 1995, he became the department manager for the Software Systems Department and in 1996 for the Internet Technology Department. He coordinated the Research Division relationship with Lotus Development and the IBM Pervasive Computing Division. He was responsible for a group of departments covering workflow, internet server performance, Internet software for K-12 education, electronic mail, and applications/middleware for handheld computers. He was also the client product manager for the IBM NetVista product. In 1996, he received IBM's Outstanding Innovation Award for his contributions to the IBM NetVista product.

From 1999 to 2004, he was the associate director of computer science for IBM Research. In 2004, he became the department group manager for software technology, where, as director of programming models and tools, he managed departments researching programming technology, software engineering, and tools for non-programmers. He moved to the research center in San Jose in October 2011, as director of computer science.

He retired from IBM at the end of 2019 and currently works as a professor for the Silicon Valley satellite campus of Northeastern University.

== Associations, conferences, and journals ==
Hailpern has authored many publications and United States patents, along with numerous conference papers and book chapters. He is a past secretary of the ACM, a past chair of the ACM Special Interest Group on Programming Languages (SIGPLAN) and a Fellow of the ACM and the IEEE. In 1998, he received SIGPLAN's Distinguished Service Award. He was the chair of the SIGPLAN '91 Conference on Programming Language Design and Implementation (Toronto, Ontario, Canada) and was chair of SIGPLAN's OOPSLA '99 Conference (Denver, Colorado). He is currently the co-chair of SIGPLAN's History of Programming Languages Conference (HOPL-III). He was a member of the program committees for the SIGPLAN '92 PLDI Conference, the Second ACM History of Programming Languages Conference, the 1993 IEEE International Conference on Distributed Computing, the AAAI99 Symposium on Modal and Temporal Logic-based Planning for Open Networked Multimedia Systems, and the First International Conference on Service Oriented Computing. He was the exhibits chair for ACM's Multimedia 95 Conference and was the publicity chair for ACM SIGPLAN's OOPSLA 97 Conference. He was an area director of ACM's SIGboard (1995–1996), a member of the editorial board for IEEE's Computer magazine (1989–1992), and a member of the OOPSLA Steering Committee (1998–2003, chair: 1999–2002, past chair 2002–2003). He was an associate editor for ACM's Transactions on Programming Languages and Systems (TOPLAS: 2001–2007). He was co-guest editor of the IBM Systems Journal special issue on software testing and verification (2002) and of the IBM Systems Journal special issue on model driven development (2006).

== Personal ==
Hailpern was a trustee of the Katonah-Lewisboro Union Free School District from July 2002 to June 2005. He was vice president of the school board from July 2003 to June 2004.
