= Structural type system =

Class of type systems

A structural type system (or property-based type system) is a major class of type systems in which type compatibility and equivalence are determined by the type's actual structure or definition and not by other characteristics such as its name or place of declaration. Structural systems are used to determine if types are equivalent and whether a type is a subtype of another. It contrasts with nominative systems, where comparisons are based on the names of the types or explicit declarations, and duck typing, in which only the part of the structure accessed at runtime is checked for compatibility.

== Description ==
In structural typing, an element is considered to be compatible with another if, for each feature within the second element's type, a corresponding and identical feature exists in the first element's type. Some languages may differ on the details, such as whether the features must match in name. This definition is not symmetric, and includes subtype compatibility. Two types are considered to be identical if each is compatible with the other.

For example, OCaml uses structural typing on methods for compatibility of object types. Go uses structural typing on methods to determine compatibility of a type with an interface. C++ template functions exhibit structural typing on type arguments. Haxe uses structural typing, but classes are not structurally subtyped.

In languages which support subtype polymorphism, a similar dichotomy can be formed based on how the subtype relationship is defined. One type is a subtype of another if and only if it contains all the features of the base type, or subtypes thereof. The subtype may contain added features, such as members not present in the base type, or stronger invariants.

A distinction exists between structural substitution for inferred and non-inferred polymorphism. Some languages, such as Haskell, do not substitute structurally in the case where an expected type is declared (i.e., not inferred), e.g., only substitute for functions that are signature-based polymorphic via type inference. Then it is not possible to accidentally subtype a non-inferred type, although it may still be possible to provide an explicit conversion to a non-inferred type, which is invoked implicitly.

Structural subtyping is arguably more flexible than nominative subtyping, as it permits the creation of ad hoc types and protocols; in particular, it permits creation of a type which is a supertype of an existing type, without modifying the definition of the latter. However, this may not be desirable where the programmer wishes to create closed abstractions.

A pitfall of structural typing versus nominative typing is that two separately defined types intended for different purposes, but accidentally holding the same properties (e.g. both composed of a pair of integers), could be considered the same type by the type system, simply because they happen to have identical structure. One way this can be avoided is by creating one algebraic data type for each use.

In 1990, Cook, et al., proved that inheritance is not subtyping in structurally-typed OO languages.

Checking that two types are compatible, based on structural typing, is a non-trivial operation, e.g., requires maintaining a stack of previous checked types.

When a type does not match the expected structure, error messages are longer than with nominal typing.

== Example ==
Objects in OCaml are structurally typed by the names and types of their methods.

Objects can be created directly (immediate objects) without going through a nominative class. Classes only serve as functions for creating objects.

 # let x =
     object
       val mutable x = 5
       method get_x = x
       method set_x y = x <- y
     end;;
 val x : < get_x : int; set_x : int -> unit > = <obj>

Here the OCaml interactive runtime prints out the inferred type of the object for convenience. Its type (< get_x : int; set_x : int -> unit >) is defined only by its methods. In other words, the type of x is defined by the method types "get_x : int" and "set_x : int -> unit" rather than by any name.

To define another object, which has the same methods and types of methods:

 # let y =
     object
       method get_x = 2
       method set_x y = Printf.printf "%d\n" y
     end;;
 val y : < get_x : int; set_x : int -> unit > = <obj>

OCaml considers them the same type. For example, the equality operator is typed to only take two values of the same type:

 # x = y;;
 - : bool = false

So they must be the same type, or else this wouldn't even type-check. This shows that equivalence of types is structural.

One can define a function that invokes a method:

 # let set_to_10 a = a#set_x 10;;
 val set_to_10 : < set_x : int -> 'a; .. > -> 'a = <fun>

The inferred type for the first argument (< set_x : int -> 'a; .. >) is interesting. The .. means that the first argument can be any object which has a "set_x" method, which takes an int as argument.

So it can be used on object x:

 # set_to_10 x;;
 - : unit = ()

Another object can be made that happens to have that method and method type; the other methods are irrelevant:

 # let z =
     object
       method blahblah = 2.5
       method set_x y = Printf.printf "%d\n" y
     end;;
 val z : < blahblah : float; set_x : int -> unit > = <obj>

The "set_to_10" function also works on it:

 # set_to_10 z;;
 10
 - : unit = ()

This shows that compatibility for things like method invocation is determined by structure.

Let us define a type synonym for objects with only a "get_x" method and no other methods:

 # type simpler_obj = < get_x : int >;;
 type simpler_obj = < get_x : int >

The object x is not of this type; but structurally, x is of a subtype of this type, since x contains a superset of its methods. So x can be coerced to this type:

 # (x :> simpler_obj);;
 - : simpler_obj = <obj>
 # (x :> simpler_obj)#get_x;;
 - : int = 10

But not object z, because it is not a structural subtype:

# (z :> simpler_obj);;
This expression cannot be coerced to type simpler_obj = < get_x : int >;
it has type < blahblah : float; set_x : int -> unit > but is here used with type
  < get_x : int; .. >
The first object type has no method get_x

This shows that compatibility for widening coercions are structural.
