= Types and Programming Languages =

Computing book by Benjamin C. Pierce

- Author: Benjamin C. Pierce
- Language: English
- Subject: Type Systems
- Genre: Computing
- Publisher: MIT Press
- Publication date: February 1, 2002
- ISBN: 978-0262162098

Types and Programming Languages, written by Benjamin C. Pierce who is a Professor of Computer and Information Science at the University of Pennsylvania is a computing book on type systems and programming languages. Types and Programming Languages was published in 2002 by MIT Press.

Since its publication, the book has become one of the most widely cited and influential texts in the field of programming language theory. It is frequently used as a graduate-level textbook in computer science programs around the world and has shaped the way type systems are taught in academic curricula.

A review by Frank Pfenning called it "probably the single most important book in the area of programming languages in recent years."
