= Benjamin C. Pierce =

American professor of computer science

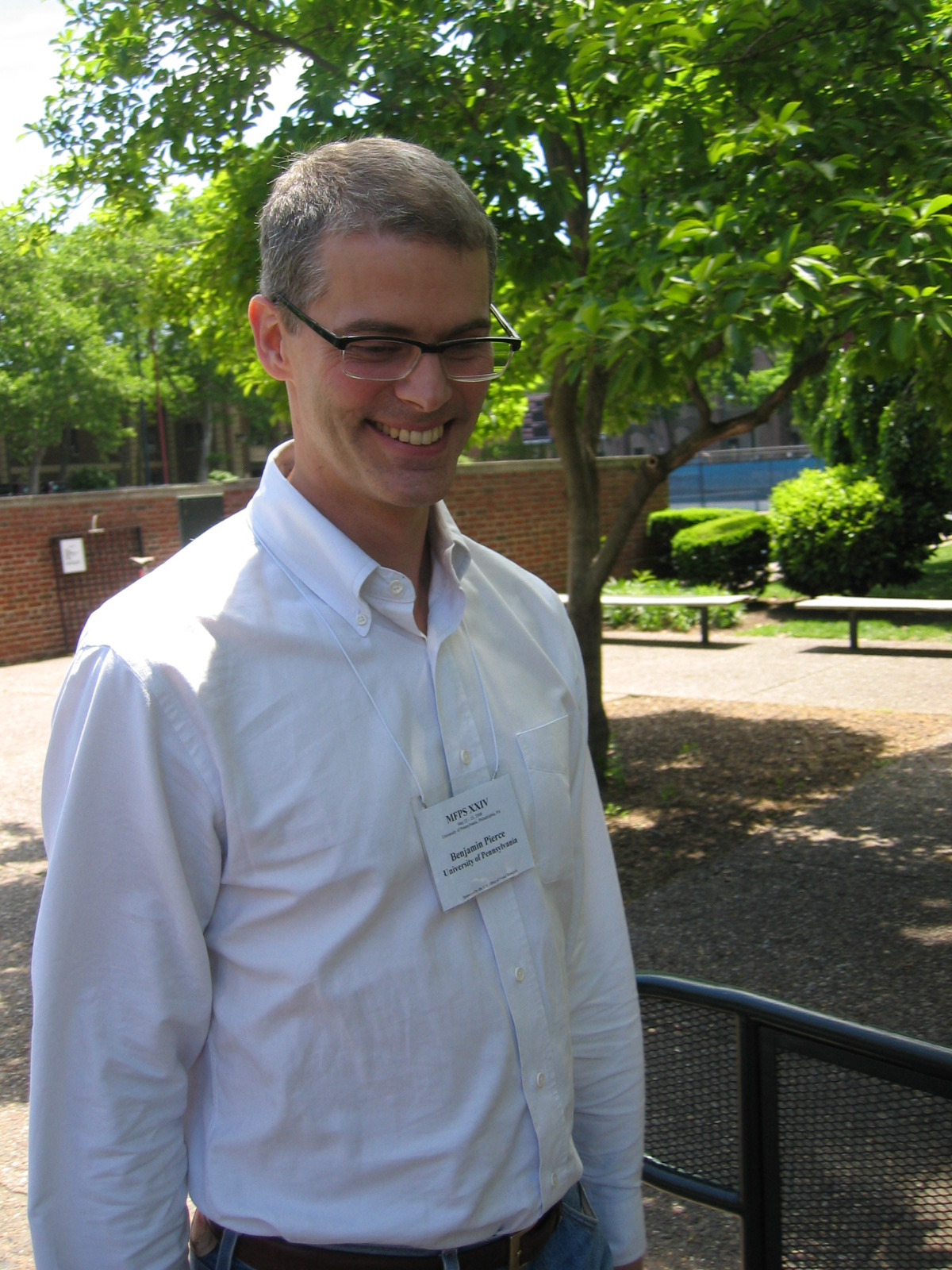
- Pierce at Mathematical Foundations of Programming Semantics 24 (Philadelphia, May 2008)
- Education: Carnegie Mellon University
- Known for: Types and Programming Languages
- Scientific career
- Thesis: Programming with Intersection Types and Bounded Polymorphism (1991)
- Doctoral advisor: Robert Harper; John C. Reynolds

Benjamin Crawford Pierce is the Henry Salvatori Professor of computer science at the University of Pennsylvania. Pierce joined Penn in 1998 from Indiana University and held research positions at the University of Cambridge and the University of Edinburgh. He received his Ph.D. from Carnegie Mellon University in 1991. His research includes work on programming languages, static type systems, distributed programming, mobile agents, process calculi, and differential privacy.

As part of his research, Pierce has led development on several open-source software projects, including the Unison file synchronization utility.

In 2012 Pierce became an ACM Fellow for "contributions to the theory and practice of programming languages and their type systems". In 2015 Pierce and co-authors received the award for the most influential Principles of Programming Languages paper, which was described as "instrumental in bringing the view-update problem to the attention of the programming languages community and demonstrating the broad relevance of the problem beyond databases. [...] More broadly, the paper sparked a great deal of follow-on work in the area of BX (“bidirectional transformations”), leading to a fruitful collaboration between the worlds of databases, programming languages, and software engineering."

== Books ==
He is the author of one book on type systems, Types and Programming Languages ISBN 0-262-16209-1. He has also edited a collection of articles to create a second volume Advanced Topics in Types and Programming Languages ISBN 0-262-16228-8. Based on the notes he collected while learning category theory during his PhD, he also published an introductory book on this topic—Basic Category Theory for Computer Scientists, ISBN 0-262-66071-7. He is one of the authors of the freely available book Software Foundations.

== See also ==
- POPLmark challenge
