= False sharing =

Performance-degrading usage pattern

In computer science, false sharing is a performance-degrading usage pattern that can arise in systems with distributed, coherent caches at the size of the smallest resource block managed by the caching mechanism. When a system participant attempts to periodically access data that is not being altered by another party, but that data shares a cache block with data that is being altered, the caching protocol may force the first participant to reload the whole cache block despite a lack of logical necessity. The caching system is unaware of activity within this block and forces the first participant to bear the caching system overhead required by true shared access of a resource.

== Multiprocessor CPU caches ==
By far the most common usage of this term is in modern multiprocessor CPU caches, where memory is cached in lines of some small power of two word size (e.g., 64 aligned, contiguous bytes). If two processors operate on independent data in the same memory address region storable in a single line, the cache coherency mechanisms in the system may force the whole line across the bus or interconnect with every data write, forcing memory stalls in addition to wasting system bandwidth. In some cases, the elimination of false sharing can result in order-of-magnitude performance improvements. False sharing is an inherent artifact of automatically synchronized cache protocols and can also exist in environments such as distributed file systems or databases, but current prevalence is limited to RAM caches.

== Example ==
#include <atomic>
#include <chrono>
#include <iostream>
#include <latch>
#include <thread>
#include <vector>

int main()
{
    std::vector<std::jthread> threads;
    const int hc = std::jthread::hardware_concurrency();
    constexpr int testLimit = 256; // for simplicity up most that many elements

    for (int nThreads = 1; nThreads <= hc && nThreads <= testLimit; ++nThreads)
    {
        // precise measurement by starting all threads simultaneously
        std::latch sync(nThreads);

        // some individual piece data for each individual thread
        struct { std::atomic_char mightBeShared; } globaldata[testLimit];

        // mitigation: occupying a full cache line
        // struct alignas(64) { std::atomic_char mightBeShared; } globaldata[testLimit];

        // sum of all threads execution times
        std::atomic_int64_t nsSum(0);

        for (int t = 0; t != nThreads; ++t)
        {
            threads.emplace_back([&](int i)
            {
                sync.arrive_and_wait(); // sync beginning of thread execution on kernel-level

                auto start = std::chrono::high_resolution_clock::now();

                for (std::size_t r = 10'000'000; r--;)
                    globaldata[i].mightBeShared.fetch_add(1);

                nsSum += std::chrono::duration_cast<std::chrono::nanoseconds>(
                    std::chrono::high_resolution_clock::now() - start
                ).count();

            }, t);
        }

        threads.clear(); // join all threads

        std::cout << nThreads << ": "
                  << static_cast<double>(nsSum / (1.0e6 * nThreads))
                  << "ms" << std::endl;
    }
}

This code shows the effect of false sharing. It creates an increasing number of threads from one thread to the number of physical threads in the system. Each thread sequentially increments one byte specific for that thread (i.e. not shared between them). The higher the level of contention between threads, the longer each increment takes, despite the fact that each thread is only incrementing its own piece of the global data. These are the results on an Intel Core i7 12th generation system with 6 performance and 8 efficiency cores yielding 20 threads:

Scaling of false sharing

As one can see, concurrent access by those threads requires about 50 times more computing time than with mitigation where it approximately doubles.

== Mitigation ==
There are ways of mitigating the effects of false sharing. For instance, false sharing in CPU caches can be prevented by reordering variables or adding padding (unused bytes) between variables. However, some of these program changes may increase the size of the objects, leading to higher memory use. Compile-time data transformations can also mitigate false-sharing. However, some of these transformations may not always be allowed. For instance, the C++ programming language standard draft of C++23 mandates that data members must be laid out so that later members have higher addresses.

There are tools for detecting false sharing. There are also systems that both detect and repair false sharing in executing programs. However, these systems incur some execution overhead.
