= Jeanne Ferrante =

American computer scientist

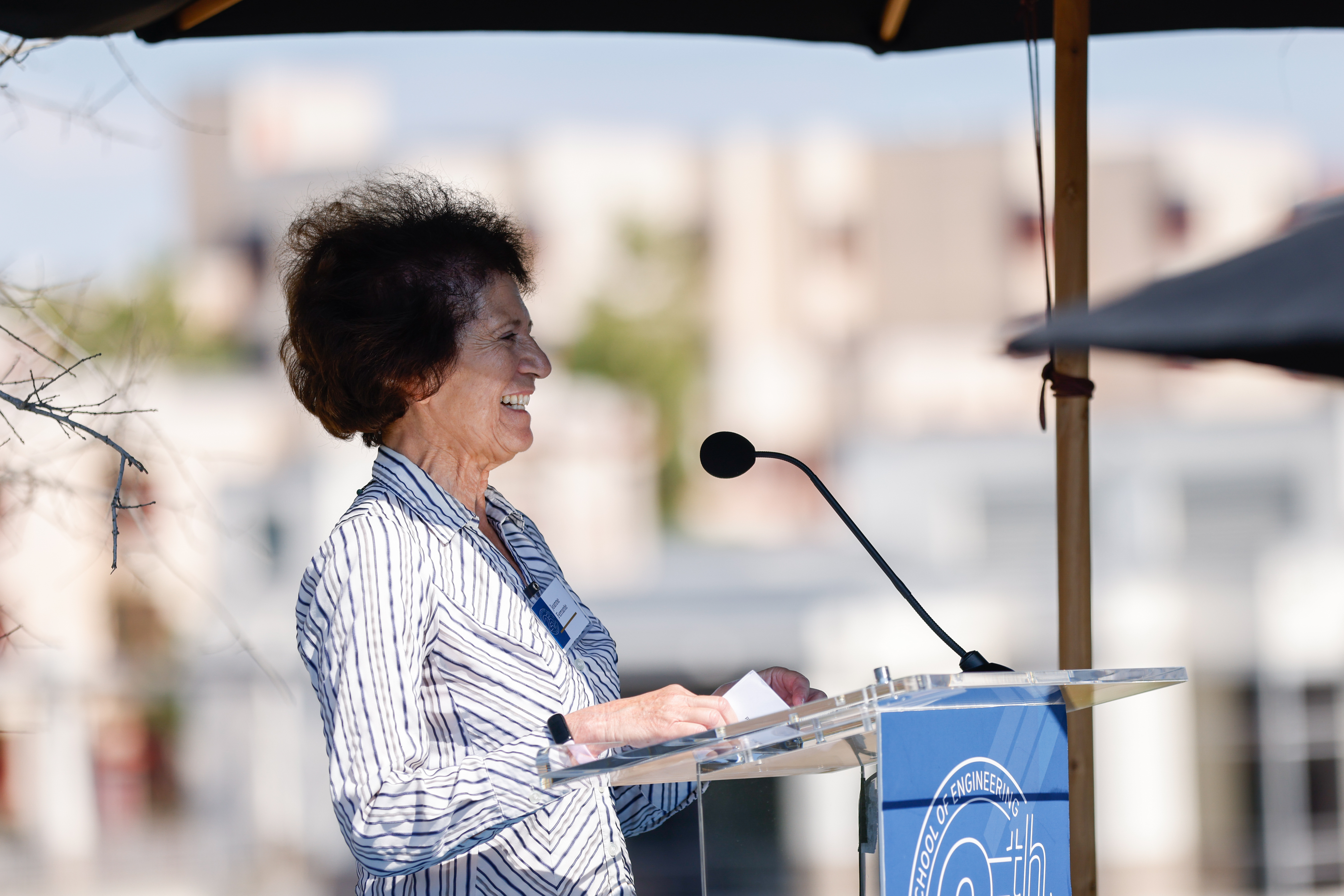
- Ferrante in 2023
- Born: January 3, 1949 (age 77)
- Spouse: Larry Carter

Academic background
- Education: BA, natural sciences, 1969, Hofstra University; PhD, mathematics, 1974, Massachusetts Institute of Technology
- Thesis: Some upper and lower bounds on decision procedures in logic

Jeanne Ferrante (born January 3, 1949) is an American computer scientist active in the field of compiler technology. As a Professor of Computer Science and Engineering at the University of California, San Diego's Jacobs School of Engineering, Ferrante has made important contributions regarding optimization and parallelization.

== Early life and education ==
Ferrante was born on January 3, 1949. She completed her Bachelor of Arts degree in natural sciences from Hofstra University in 1969 and her PhD in mathematics from the Massachusetts Institute of Technology in 1974. During her undergraduate studies, Ferrante originally wished to pursue a career as a high school chemistry teacher but was encouraged by a female professor to pursue a career in mathematics.

== Career ==
Following her PhD, Ferrante taught at Tufts University until 1978 when she became a Research Staff Member at IBM's Thomas J. Watson Research Center. While with IBM, she worked on computational complexity problems such as the theory of rational order and first order theory of real addition. In the 1980s, Ferrante collaborated with various researchers at IBM to develop the Static Single Assignment form (SSA). The SSA is a data structure that allows for more efficient methods of transforming the user's program to machine code. Ferrante was later recognized for her collaborative work with the SSA form by the Association for Computing Machinery with their 2006 SIGPLAN Programming Languages Achievement Award. In 1992, Ferrante and her husband Larry Carter decided to look for academic jobs after learning of major changes coming to IBM's research division. After being encouraged by Francine Berman to apply to University of California, San Diego's (UCSD) Jacobs School of Engineering, they were both offered full professorships in 1994.

Upon joining the faculty of UCSD, Ferrante served as the Computer Science and Engineering Department Chair from 1996 to 1999 and Associate Dean of Engineering from 2002 to 2013. In her first year as department chair, Ferrante was elected a Fellow of the Association for Computing Machinery (ACM). As UCSD's Associate Dean, Ferrante focused on developing programs to encourage women to pursue careers in science. In 2004, she founded the Teams in Engineering Service (TIES) program which matches UCSD undergraduates with San Diego non-profit organizations to "solve technology-based problems for their community clients." In the same year, Ferrante was elected a Fellow of the Institute of Electrical and Electronics Engineers (IEEE) for her "contributions to optimizing and parallelizing compilers." She subsequently became one of the only UCSD academics to hold fellowships simultaneously in IEEE and the ACM. Later, Ferrante served as the co-principal investigator of the Information Technology Experiences for Students and Teachers (ITEST) award program to create a multiplayer online science challenge game designed specifically for middle and high school aged girls. As a result of her efforts, Ferrante received the 2007 Athena Educator Pinnacle Award. In 2008, Ferrante was appointed the inaugural Associate Vice Chancellor for Faculty Equity, which was created in response to recommendations of the UCSD Workgroup on the Report of the UC President's Task Force on Faculty Diversity. In this role, Ferrante was one of three faculty members to receive a 2012 Diversity Award for their efforts to promote diversity and equity on the UCSD campus.

Ferrante remained active within the UCSD Jacobs School of Engineering until 2014 when she became a professor Emeritus.
