= Barbara G. Ryder =

American computer scientist

Barbara Gershon Ryder
- Education: Rutgers University; Stanford University; Brown University
- Known for: programming languages
- Awards: ACM Fellow (1998)
- Scientific career
- Fields: Computer Science
- Workplaces: Virginia Tech; Rutgers University
- Website: people.cs.vt.edu/~ryder/

Barbara G. Ryder is an American computer scientist noted for her research on programming languages and more specifically, the theoretical foundations and empirical investigation of interprocedural compile-time analysis.

== Biography ==
Ryder received an A.B. in applied mathematics from Brown University in 1969. She received a M.S. in computer science from Stanford University in 1971 and a Ph.D in computer science from Rutgers University in 1982.

She then joined the Department of Computer Science at Rutgers University as an assistant professor in 1982. While there she was promoted to associate professor in 1988 and to professor in 1994. In 2008, she moved to Virginia Tech as head of the Department of Computer Science 2018–2015). She held the J. Byron Maupin Professorship in Engineering. She retired in 2016.

Through her career of 33 years, she has been dedicated to mentoring and education. Ryder has mentored 15 doctoral students and three master's students as well as mentoring four post-doctoral researchers.

Ryder is a charter member of the National Center for Women and Information Technology Pacesetters program directed toward increasing the number of women in computer science.

Together with co-PI Susan B. Horwitz, she received an NSF grant to address recruitment of underrepresented groups to the computer science program. This grant funding allowed creation of a collaboration between eight schools implementing peer-led learning (PLTLCS), including the University of Wisconsin–Madison with Horwitz, Duke University, Georgia Tech, Rutgers University, University of Wisconsin at Milwaukee, Purdue University, Beloit College, and Loyola College. This consortium published a 2009 paper that demonstrated that active recruiting combined with peer-led team learning is an effective approach to attracting and retaining underrepresented students in an introductory Computer Science class.

== Awards ==
In 1998 she was named an ACM Fellow. She was also awarded Fellow of the American Association for the Advancement of Science in 2023.

Her other notable awards include:

- ACM Presidential Award (2008)
- ACM SIGPLAN Distinguished Service Award (2001)
- PLDI'92 paper selected for Best of PLDI Collection 1970–1996 in April 2003. The paper was titled: A Safe Approximate Algorithm for Interprocedural Pointer Aliasing.
- Association for Computing Machinery's Influential Educator Award (2015)
- Virginia American Association of University Women, Women of Achievement Award 2014
