= Greg Morrisett =

Computer science scholar

John Gregory Morrisett
- Education: University of Richmond (BS); Carnegie Mellon University (MS, PhD)
- Scientific career
- Fields: Computer science
- Workplaces: Cornell University; Harvard University
- Thesis: Compiling with Types (1995)
- Doctoral advisor: Robert Harper; Jeannette Wing
- Website: tech.cornell.edu/people/greg-morrisett/

John Gregory Morrisett is a computer science scholar who has been serving as dean and vice provost of Cornell Tech in New York City since June 2019. Previously he served as dean for computing and information science at Cornell University in Ithaca from 2015 to 2019 and director of the Center for Research on Computation and Society at Harvard University from 2012 to 2014.

Morrisett received a Bachelor of Science with major in mathematics and computer science from the University of Richmond in Virginia in 1989. From Carnegie Mellon University in Pennsylvania, he received a Master of Science in computer science in 1991 and a Doctor of Philosophy in computer science in 1995.

The group he was part of at Cornell University created the Cyclone programming language in 2002. In 2013, he became a Fellow of the Association for Computing Machinery.
