= OOPSLA =

Annual computing conference

- Abbreviation: OOPSLA
- Discipline: Object-oriented programming

Publication details
- Publisher: ACM
- History: 1986–present
- Frequency: annual

Object-Oriented Programming, Systems, Languages & Applications (OOPSLA) is an annual ACM research conference. OOPSLA mainly takes place in the United States, while the sister conference of OOPSLA, ECOOP, is typically held in Europe. It is operated by the Special Interest Group for Programming Languages (SIGPLAN) group of the Association for Computing Machinery (ACM).

OOPSLA has been instrumental in helping object-oriented programming develop into a mainstream programming paradigm. It has also helped incubate a number of related topics, including design patterns, refactoring, aspect-oriented programming, model-driven engineering, agile software development, and domain specific languages.

The first OOPSLA conference was held in Portland, Oregon, in 1986. As of 2010, OOPSLA became a part of the SPLASH conference. SPLASH stands for Systems, Programming, Languages, and Applications: Software for Humanity.
