= List of Bell Labs alumni =

The American research and development (R&D) company Bell Labs is known for its many alumni who have won various awards, including the Nobel Prize and the ACM Turing Award.

== List ==
- __ Nobel Prize
- __ Turing Award

Image	Alumni	Notes
	Alistair E. Ritchie	Bell Labs scientist and co-author of The Design of Switching Circuits on switching circuit theory. Father of Dennis M. Ritchie.
	Alfred Aho	Advanced compiler theory and wrote the well known Dragon Book with Jeffrey Ullman on compiler design.
	Ali Javan	Invented the gas laser in 1960.
	Arno Allan Penzias	Discovered background radiation, with Robert W. Wilson, originating from the Big Bang and won the Nobel Prize in 1978 for the discovery.
	Amos E. Joel Jr.	Was an American electrical engineer, known for several contributions and over seventy patents related to telecommunications switching systems. Joel worked at Bell Labs (1940–83) where he first undertook cryptology studies (collaboration with Claude Shannon), followed by studies on electronic switching system that resulted in the 1ESS switch (1948–60). He then headed the development of advanced telephone services (1961–68), which led to several patents, including one on Traffic Service Position System and a mechanism for handoff in cellular communication (1972). Received the * National Medal of Technology (1993). Inducted into the * National Inventors Hall of Fame (2008).
	Arthur Ashkin	Has been considered the father of the topical field of optical tweezers, for which he was awarded the Nobel Prize in Physics 2018.
	Arthur Hebard	Noted for leading the discovery of superconductivity in Buckminsterfullerene in 1991.
	Arun N. Netravali	2001 National Medal of Technology... Video signal interpolation using motion estimation Patent US4383272A
	Bishnu Atal	Developed new speech processing and encoding algorithms, including fundamental work on linear prediction of speech and linear predictive coding (LPC), and the development of code-excited linear prediction (CELP) speech encoding, the basis for all speech communication codecs in mobile and Internet voice communications.
	Bjarne Stroustrup	Was the head of Bell Labs Large-scale Programming Research department, from its creation until late 2002 and created the C++ programming language.
	Brian Kernighan	Helped to create Unix, AWK, AMPL and authored along with Dennis Ritchie influential The C Programming Language book.
	Calvin Fuller	A chemist that invented the practical silicon solar cell for telephone equipment with colleagues, Daryl Chapin and Gerald Pearson in 1954. Received the National Inventors Hall of Fame in 2008.
	Claire F. Gmachl	Developed novel designs for solid-state lasers leading to advances in the development of quantum cascade lasers.
	Claude Shannon	Founded information theory with the publishing of A Mathematical Theory of Communication in 1948. He is perhaps equally well known for founding both digital computer and digital circuit design theory in 1937, when, as a 21-year-old master's degree student at the Massachusetts Institute of Technology (MIT), he wrote his thesis demonstrating that electrical applications of Boolean algebra could construct any logical, numerical relationship. Shannon contributed to the field of cryptanalysis for national defense during World War II, including his basic work on codebreaking and secure telecommunications. For two months early in 1943, Shannon came into contact with the leading British cryptanalyst and mathematician Alan Turing. Shannon and Turing met at teatime in the cafeteria. Turing showed Shannon his 1936 paper that defined what is now known as the "Universal Turing machine"; this impressed Shannon, as many of its ideas complemented his own.
	Clinton Davisson	Davisson and Lester Germer performed an experiment showing that electrons were diffracted at the surface of a crystal of nickel. This celebrated Davisson-Germer experiment confirmed the de Broglie hypothesis that particles of matter have a wave-like nature, which is a central tenet of quantum mechanics. Their observation of diffraction allowed the first measurement of a wavelength for electrons. He shared the Nobel Prize in 1937 with George Paget Thomson, who independently discovered electron diffraction at about the same time as Davisson.
	Clyde G. Bethea	
	Corinna Cortes	Head of Google Research, New York.
	Daniel Tsui	Along with Robert Laughlin and Horst Störmer discovered new form of quantum fluid.
	David A. B. Miller	
	Daryl Chapin	An engineer that invented the practical silicon solar cell for telephone equipment with colleagues, Calvin Fuller and Gerald Pearson in 1954. Received the National Inventors Hall of Fame in 2008.
	Dawon Kahng	Invented the MOSFET (metal–oxide–semiconductor field-effect transistor) with Mohamed M. Atalla in 1959. It revolutionized the electronics industry, and is the most widely used semiconductor device in the world.
	Dennis Ritchie	Created the C programming language and, with long-time colleague Ken Thompson, the Unix operating system. Received the * National Medal of Technology (1998) with Ken Thompson, presented by President William Clinton.
	Donald Cox	Received the IEEE Alexander Graham Bell Medal (1993)
	Donald P. Ling	Staff at BTL. In 1954, co-author of "Command Guidance for a Ballistic Missile". Vice president of Bell Labs and, in 1970, president of Bellcom, Inc. Retirement was 1971.
	Don McMillan	Former engineer at Murray Hill location for the world's first 32-bit microprocessor.
	Douglas McIlroy	Proposed Unix pipelines and developed several Unix tools. Pioneering researcher of macro processors, code reuse and component-based software engineering. Participated in the design of multiple influential programming languages, particularly PL/I, SNOBOL, ALTRAN, TMG and C++.
	Edward Lawry Norton	Namesake of Norton's theorem.
	Elizabeth Bailey	Worked in technical programming at Bell Laboratories from 1960 to 1972, before transferring to the economic research section from 1972 to 1977.
	Eric Betzig	An American physicist who worked to develop the field of fluorescence microscopy and photoactivated localization microscopy. He was awarded the 2014 Nobel Prize in Chemistry for "the development of super-resolved fluorescence microscopy" along with Stefan Hell and fellow Cornell alumnus William E. Moerner.
	Eric Schmidt	Did a complete re-write with Mike Lesk of Lex, a program to generate lexical analysers for the Unix computer operating system.
	Erna Schneider Hoover	Invented the computerized telephone switching method.
	Esther M. Conwell	Studied effects of high electric fields on electron transport in semiconductors, member of the National Academy of Engineering, National Academy of Sciences, and the American Academy of Arts and Sciences.
	Evelyn Hu	Pioneer in the fabrication of nanoscale electronic and photonic devices.
	Everett T. Burton	Time Division Multiplexing: Patent US2917583A Time separation communication system.
	George E. Smith	Lead research into novel lasers and semiconductor devices. During his tenure, Smith was awarded dozens of patents and eventually headed the VLSI device department. George E. Smith shared the 2009 Nobel Prize in Physics with Willard Boyle for "the invention of an imaging semiconductor circuit—the CCD sensor, which has become an electronic eye in almost all areas of photography".
	Gerald Pearson	A physicist that invented the practical silicon solar cell for telephone equipment with colleagues, Daryl Chapin and Calvin Fuller in 1954. Received the National Inventors Hall of Fame in 2008.
	Gil Amelio	Amelio was on the team that demonstrated the first working charge-coupled device (CCD). Worked at Fairchild Semiconductor, and the semiconductor division of Rockwell International but is best remembered as a CEO of National Semiconductor and Apple Inc.
	Harvey Fletcher	As Director of Research at Bell Labs, he oversaw research in electrical sound recording, including more than 100 stereo recordings with conductor Leopold Stokowski in 1931–1932.
	Horst Ludwig Störmer	Along with Robert Laughlin and Daniel Tsui discovered new form of quantum fluid.
	Howard M. Jackson II	Electrical engineer at Western Electric Co. where he worked in a manufacturing group of equipment for USAF bombing navigation systems. Employment for Bell Labs took him from Whippany, NJ, to Kwajalein, Marshall Islands, Naperville, IL, and back to Murray Hill, NJ. Worked mainly on computer technology including early missile detection software for Safeguard Anti-Ballistic Missile systems.
	John Hopcroft	Received the Turing Award jointly with Robert Tarjan in 1986 for fundamental achievements in the design and analysis of algorithms and data structures.
John Hopfield	John Hopfield	Member of the technical staff at Bell Laboratories from 1958 to 1960 and from 1973 to 1989. Introduced the Hopfield network, a model of associative memory, in 1982. Shared the 2024 Nobel Prize in Physics with Geoffrey Hinton for foundational work enabling machine learning with artificial neural networks.
	Ian Munro Ross	
	Ingrid Daubechies	Developed the orthogonal Daubechies wavelet and the biorthogonal Cohen–Daubechies–Feauveau wavelet. She is best known for her work with wavelets in image compression (such as JPEG 2000) and digital cinema.
	James West	Joined Bell Telephone Laboratories in 1957 and holds more than 250 U.S. and foreign patents. One important patent is foil electret microphone with Gerhard M. Sessler.
	Jeffrey Ullman	Advanced compiler theory and wrote the well known Dragon Book with Alfred Aho on compiler design.
	Jessie MacWilliams	Developed the MacWilliams identities in coding theory.
	John Mashey	Worked on the PWB/UNIX operating system at Bell Labs from 1973 to 1983, authoring the PWB shell, also known as the "Mashey Shell".
	John M. Chambers	Developed the statistical programming language S, which is the forerunner to R.
	John Bardeen	With William Shockley and Walter Brattain, the three scientists invented the point-contact transistor in 1947 and were jointly awarded the 1956 Nobel Prize in Physics.
	Walter A. MacNair	Electrical engineer from 1929 to 1952. Worked at Consolidated Engineering Corporation, associated with NASA projects as Aerospace Officials.
	Jon Hall	Executive Director of Linux International
	Ken Thompson	Designed and implemented the original Unix operating system. He also invented the B programming language, the direct predecessor to the C programming language, and was one of the creators and early developers of the Plan 9 operating systems. With Joseph Henry Condon he designed and built Belle, the first chess machine to earn a master rating. Since 2006, Thompson has worked at Google, where he co-invented the Go programming language. Received the * National Medal of Technology (1998) with Dennis Ritchie, presented by President William Clinton.
	Laurie Spiegel	Electronic musician and engineer known for developing the algorithmic composition software Music Mouse.
	Louis Brus	In 1972, began a 23-year career at AT&T Bell Labs in the studies of nanocrystals. Professor Emeritus at Columbia University. A 2023 Nobel Prize Laureate of Chemistry for quantum dots.
	Lloyd Espenschied	In 1910, worked for AT&T and worked on designing loading coils. In 1915, at Arlington, Virginia location, participated on the transoceanic radio telephone experiments using vacuum tube transmitter. Member of Development and Research Department at Bell Telephone Laboratories, worked on early carrier transmission system in the 1920s. Worked with Maurice E. Strieby on the 1929 Phoenixville, Pennsylvania cable experiments. Co-inventor with Herman Alfred Affel on wide-band coaxial cable system. Inventor of the radio altimeter, successfully demonstrated in 1938. Patent holder of about 130 inventions and IRE Member of Honor in 1940. Retired in 1954 and collection of his papers are in the National Museum of American History.
	Louis John Lanzerotti	Physicist with AT&T technical staff and Lucent Technologies Bell Labs, NASA Physical Science Committee, 1975 to 1979; Co-author of Diffusion in Radiation Belts. NASA's Distinguished Public Service Award, 1988 and 1994. Who's Who in America, 2000, 54th Ed. New Providence, NJ and Marquis Who's Who, 1999.
	Margaret H. Wright	Pioneer in numerical computing and mathematical optimization, head of the Scientific Computing Research Department and Bell Labs Fellow, president of the Society for Industrial and Applied Mathematics.
	Marian Croak	
	Maurice Karnaugh	Famous for the Karnaugh map.
	Maurice E. Strieby	In 1916, joined New York Telephone and served in the Army Signal Corps.. In 1919, returned to AT&T as a member of Development and Research Department. Worked on early carrier transmission system with Lloyd Espenschied. Participated in the 1929 cable experiments at Phoenixville, Pennsylvania. Worked in Bell Telephone Laboratories in various positions upon retiring in 1956. Consultant for the cable television systems after retirement. Who's Who in Engineering in 1959. Deceased 1975.
	Max Mathews	Wrote MUSIC, the first widely used program for sound generation, in 1957.
	Melvin J. Kelly	Research physicist, director of research in 1934, vice president in 1944, and president from 1951 to 1959. Focused on radar, gunfire control, and bombsights. Retired from BTL and became advisor to NASA Administrator James E. Webb in 1961. Deceased 1971.
	Mohamed M. Atalla	Developed the silicon surface passivation process in 1957, and then invented the MOSFET (metal–oxide–semiconductor field-effect transistor), the first practical implementation of a field-effect transistor, with Dawon Kahng in 1959. This led to a breakthrough in semiconductor technology, and revolutionized the electronics industry.
	Moungi Bawendi	Worked at Bell Labs as a summer hire. Louis Brus was his mentor at Bell Labs with nanocrystals. Bawendi's research lead to improved quality and production of quantum dots in 1993. A 2023 Nobel Prize Laureate of Chemistry for quantum dots.
	Narain Gehani	
	Narendra Karmarkar	Developed Karmarkar's algorithm.
	Neil deGrasse Tyson	Summer Intern at Murray Hill Bell Labs. American astrophysicist, author, and science communicator.
	Neil Sloane	Created the On-Line Encyclopedia of Integer Sequences.
	Osamu Fujimura	Japanese physicist, phonetician and linguist, recognized as one of the pioneers of speech science. Invented the C/D model of speech articulation.
	Persi Diaconis	Known for tackling mathematical problems involving randomness and randomization, such as coin flipping and shuffling playing cards.
	Philip Warren Anderson	In 1977 Anderson was awarded the Nobel Prize in Physics for his investigations into the electronic structure of magnetic and disordered systems, which allowed for the development of electronic switching and memory devices in computers.
	Phyllis Fox	Co-wrote the DYNAMO simulation programming language, principal author of the first LISP manual, and developed the PORT Mathematical Subroutine Library.
	Richard Hamming	Created a family of mathematical error-correcting code, which are called Hamming codes. Programmed one of the earliest computers, the IBM 650, and with Ruth A. Weiss developed the L2 programming language, one of the earliest computer languages, in 1956.
	Robert Laughlin	Along with Horst Störmer and Daniel Tsui discovered new form of quantum fluid.
	Robert W. Lucky	
	Rob Pike	A member of the Unix team and was involved in the creation of the Plan 9 and Inferno operating systems, as well as the Limbo programming language. Co-authored the books The Unix Programming Environment and The Practice of Programming with Brian Kernighan. Co-created the UTF-8 character encoding standard with Ken Thompson, the Blit graphical terminal with Bart N. Locanthi and the sam and acme text editors. Pike has worked at Google, where he co-created the Go and Sawzall programming languages.
	Robert Tarjan	Received the Turing Award jointly with John Hopcroft in 1986 for fundamental achievements in the design and analysis of algorithms and data structures.
	Robert H. "Bob" Shennum	He led the satellite design and launch of Telstar I and II at Bell Labs of New Jersey. Directed the research labs for the next 31 years, started 1954, after his Ph.D. in physics and electrical engineering from California Institute of Technology. During the 60s and 70s lead research units for microwave radio design, mathematical analysis and digital systems design. He managed development of SAFEGUARD missile systems and a lab to research and develop new sources of power. In 1974, received the U.S. Army Citation for Patriotic Civilian Service for his contribution to the SAFEGUARD ABM missile systems. This military work would be from the North Carolina Labs.
	Robert W. Wilson	Discovered background radiation, with Arno Allan Penzias, originating from the Big Bang and won the Nobel Prize in 1978 for that.
	Ron Brachman	Later was Director of Artificial Intelligence at DARPA.
	Russell Shoemaker Ohl	A semiconductor researcher that invented the p-n junction for the basis of a solar cell. His patented invention in 1940, achieved one percent efficiency of a solar cell.
	Sharon Haynie	Developed DuPont's bio-3G product line and adhesives to close wounds.
	Shirley Jackson	Started in Bell Telephone Laboratories in 1976 as the first African American female with a physics PH.D.. Worked on several areas of theoretical physics that were ground breaking.
	Steve Bourne	Created the Bourne shell and the adb debugger, and authored the book The Unix System. He also served as president of the Association for Computing Machinery (ACM) (2000–2002), was made a fellow of the ACM (2005), received the ACM Presidential Award (2008) and the Outstanding Contribution to ACM Award (2017).
	Steven Chu	Known for his research at Bell Labs and Stanford University in cooling and trapping of atoms with laser light, which won him the Nobel Prize in Physics in 1997, along with his scientific colleagues Claude Cohen-Tannoudji and William Daniel Phillips.
	Steven Cundiff	Was instrumental in the development of the first frequency comb that led to one half of the 2005 Nobel prize. Also made significant contributions to the ultrafast dynamics of semiconductor nanostructures, including the 2014 discovery of the dropleton quasi-particle.
	Stuart Feldman	Creator of the computer software program make for Unix systems. He was also an author of the first Fortran 77 compiler, and he was part of the original group at Bell Labs that created the Unix operating system.
	Susan Gianforte	Former mechanical engineer at Bell Laboratories and former First Lady of Montana with spouse, Greg Gianforte.
	Thomas H. Crowley	Mathematician and AT&T executive, author of 1967 expository best seller "Understanding Computers". Executive director of the Safeguard anti-ballistic missile system software division of Bell Labs. Also, Bell Telephone Laboratories in Murray Hill, N.J. He earned several patents for his technical work, headed computer research departments at Bell Labs, including development and marketing of UNIX, and retired in 1985 as software vice-president, AT&T Information Systems.
	Trevor Hastie	Known for his contributions to applied statistics, especially in the field of machine learning, data mining, and bioinformatics.
	Vernon Stanley Mummert	
	Walter Houser Brattain	With fellow scientists John Bardeen and William Shockley, invented the point-contact transistor in December 1947. They shared the 1956 Nobel Prize in Physics for their invention.
	Walter Lincoln Hawkins	Started in Bell Labs, developed sheathing. Polymer Cable Sheath Patent US 2,967,845 National Inventors Hall of Fame.
	Warren P. Mason	Founder of distributed-element circuits, inventor of the GT quartz crystal, and many discoveries and inventions in ultrasonics and acoustics.
	James Wayne Hunt	Started in Bell Labs 1973. In May 1977, published the Hunt-Szymanski Algorithm paper which was an application example of the UNIX diff command.
	Willard Boyle	Shares the 2009 Nobel Prize in Physics with George E. Smith for "the invention of an imaging semiconductor circuit—the CCD sensor, which has become an electronic eye in almost all areas of photography."
	William O. Baker	
	William S. Cleveland	Professor of statistics and computer science, previously worked at Bell Labs on the development of S.
	William A. Massey	Bell Labs in 1977.
	William B. Snow	Made major contributions to acoustics from 1923 to 1940. Fellow of the Audio Engineering Society (AES), received its Gold Medal Award in 1968.
	William Shockley	With John Bardeen and Walter Brattain, the three scientists invented the point-contact transistor in 1947 and were jointly awarded the 1956 Nobel Prize in Physics.
	Yann LeCun	Recognized as a founding father of convolutional neural networks and for work on optical character recognition and computer vision. He received the Turing Award in 2018 with Geoffrey Hinton and Yoshua Bengio for their work in deep learning.
	Yoshua Bengio	Received the Turing Award in 2018 with Geoffrey Hinton and Yann LeCun for their work in deep learning.
	Zhenan Bao	Development of the first all plastic transistor, or organic field-effect transistors which allows for its use in electronic paper.
