= Introduction to the Theory of Computation =

1997 computer science textbook

Introduction to the Theory of Computation (ISBN 0-534-95097-3) is a textbook in theoretical computer science, written by Michael Sipser and first published by PWS Publishing in 1997. The third edition appeared in July 2012.

== See also ==
- Introduction to Automata Theory, Languages, and Computation by John Hopcroft and Jeffrey Ullman, an older textbook in the same field
