= Seattle–Tacoma (disambiguation) =

Seattle–Tacoma is a metropolitan area in the U.S. state of Washington.

Seattle–Tacoma may also refer to:

- Seattle–Tacoma International Airport, the primary international airport serving the Seattle–Tacoma metropolitan area
- Seattle–Tacoma International Airport station, a light rail station in SeaTac, Washington
- Seattle–Tacoma combined statistical area, which encompasses most of the Puget Sound region
- Seattle–Tacoma Box Company
- Seattle–Tacoma Shipbuilding Corporation

== See also ==
- SeaTac (disambiguation)
