= Xiaoqin Li =

Chinese-American physicist

- Education: Beijing Normal University; University of Michigan
- Known for: Quantum electrodyamics
- Scientific career
- Fields: Quantum electrodynamics; nanophotonics; quantum theory; spectroscopy
- Workplaces: University of Texas at Austin
- Thesis: "Coherent transient nonlinear optical spectroscopic studies of single semiconductor quantum dots: Applications to quantum information processing." (2003)

Xiaoqin Elaine Li is a Chinese and American experimental physicist whose work uses ultrafast laser spectroscopy to study the quantum electrodynamics of electrons and the quantum properties of nanostructures including van der Waals heterostructures, quantum dots, and optical metamaterials. She is a professor of physics at the University of Texas at Austin, where she directs the Texas Quantum Institute and holds the Jack S. Josey Welch Foundation Science Chair in Science.

== Education and career ==
Li entered the physics program at Beijing Normal University intending to teach physics at the high school level, but was encouraged by a professor there to continue her studies abroad, at the graduate level. After graduating in 1997, she completed her Ph.D. in 2003, at the University of Michigan. There, she was one of many doctoral students of Duncan G. Steel.

She became a postdoctoral researcher at JILA, formerly the Joint Institute for Laboratory Astrophysics, at the University of Colorado Boulder. She became a faculty member at the University of Texas at Austin in 2007, reaching the rank of full professor in 2018.

== Recognition ==
Li was a 2008 recipient of a Sloan Research Fellowship, and a 2009 recipient of the Presidential Early Career Award for Scientists and Engineers. She was a Humboldt Research Fellow in 2013–2015, funding her for a visit to Technische Universität Berlin to work with Ulrike Woggon.

In 2015, Li was named a Fellow of the American Physical Society, "for contributions to quantum information, multidimensional coherent spectroscopy, nanophotonics based on AFM assembly, and spin dynamics in ferromagnetic nanostructures". In 2024, she was elected as a Fellow of the American Association for the Advancement of Science.
