= Dragon Book =

The Dragon Book may refer to:

- Principles of Compiler Design, a book by Alfred V. Aho, and Jeffrey D. Ullman
- Compilers: Principles, Techniques, and Tools, a book by Alfred V. Aho, Monica S. Lam, Ravi Sethi, and Jeffrey D. Ullman
- The Dragon Book, a 2009 fantasy anthology co-edited by Gardner Dozois
