= List of Modern Magic Made Simple episodes =

The Modern Magic Made Simple anime adaptation was produced by Nomad. The first episode numbered 00, was first shown at a joint event of Gendai Mahou and Hatsukoi Limited held on June 14, 2009, this episode was later streamed online by Bandai Channel from June 29 till July 6, 2009. The TV series started airing on July 11, 2009.

The opening theme is "programming for non-fiction" by Natsuko Aso. The ending theme "Made in WONDER" by Aki Misato.

== Episodes ==
All the episode titles are taken from programming-related terms and slang, all by the author of the light novel Hiroshi Sakurazaka.

| No. | Title | Original release date |
|---|---|---|
| 0 | "cruncha cruncha cruncha" | June 14, 2009 (OVA) |
Yumiko thinks that Misa isn't teaching Koyomi magic properly, since Koyomi can still only summon washbasins. Yumiko decides to teach her Classical Magic, since Misa's teaching of Modern Magic doesn't seem to be helping Yumiko.
| 1 | "hello, world" | July 11, 2009 |
This episode starts with Yumiko in elementary school, having a difficult time. She has no friends, and thinks those around her are beneath her. She takes her great-grandfather's staff, Kerykeion, and runs away to find the Anehara Cross School of Magic. On the way there she is attacked by Jean-Jacques Guibarthez who wants her staff. She makes it to the gates of the school, where Guibarthez attempts to kill her again. There she meets Koyomi who defends her from Guibarthez.
| 2 | "wizardry" | July 18, 2009 |
Koyomi finds a piece of paper that says if you want to change yourself, you can learn magic at the Anehara Cross School of Magic. Koyomi goes there only and meets Misa. Misa tests Koyomi for magic aptitude, but Koyomi fails. The next day after school, Koyomi and Kaho go to a shopping district together, only to get separated. Koyomi uses magic to protect a girl from getting attacked, and Misa happens to witness it. Misa invites Koyomi to help her out with her current job. Afterwards, Misa offers to teach Modern Magic to Koyomi.
| 3 | "Deus In Machina" | July 25, 2009 |
Yumiko stops a thief at the airport, and discovers a daemon in one of the computers. While hunting the source of the daemon, she tracks it to the school that Koyomi and Kaho attend. Yumiko chases the daemon from the school while Koyomi and Kaho watch. Yumiko and Koyomi encounter each other again in the street, and Koyomi offers to help her find the source of the daemons.
| 4 | "jini" | August 1, 2009 |
Yumiko has Misa examine the airport computer where she found the daemon. Misa finds that someone else modified one of her codes to create the daemon. Misa, Soshiro, Koyomi, Kaho and Yumiko go the local water park for what seems like a break. While there, Misa talks to another modern mage, Gary Huang, who tells her that person who modified her code is dead. The group also encounters a jini in the water who has been playing pranks on the water park customers. They decide to track down the jini to put a stop to the pranks before someone gets hurt.
| 5 | "jump off into never-never land" | August 8, 2009 |
Misa asks Koyomi to help her obtain the master password to a worm – the "Christmas Shopper" – written by Misa 6 years ago. Using ghostscripts, Misa sends Koyomi back into the past so she can get the master password from Misa herself. In the past, Koyomi goes looking for Yumiko to help her battle Jean-Jacques Guibarthez.
| 6 | "ghostscript" | August 15, 2009 |
In the past, Yumiko agrees to fight Jean-Jacques Guibarthez on top of a Ginza department store, one that she had visited with her parents. Guibarthez wants Yumiko's staff, Kerykeion, because in it is the Sorceress Library, which Guibarthez hopes to use to resurrect Digitalis Flammalacia, the most powerful sorceress who ever lived. Koyomi finds Yumiko fighting a losing battle against Guibarthez. The two decide upon a likely attack plan, only to be defeated by Guibarthez's use of ghostscripts to protect him from their attacks. Misa, after having executed the Christmas Shopper worm to create an amulet for herself, appears, and the three mages battle Guibarthez to the end.
| 7 | "voodoo programming" | August 22, 2009 |
Koyomi buys a turtle backpack as her magic item in order to improve her magical ability, but it doesn't work out as she'd hoped. Yumiko talks to her and realizes that Koyomi's real problem is her lack of confidence, so Yumiko helps her secretly to increase her self-confidence.
| 8 | "scratch monkey" | August 29, 2009 |
Misa goes looking for clues about the programmer who modified her code, and finds out that he is still alive in another town. While she is on the plane returning from her trip, Gary Huang tells her that he placed a bomb on the plane. While Misa is distracted trying to find the bomb, Huang breaks into her house to steal her grandfather's sword, the one that was used to kill Jean-Jacque Guibarthez 100 years ago.
| 9 | "Open DeathTrap" | September 5, 2009 |
Gary Huang revives Jean-Jacques Guibarthez's ghostscript from Misa's grandfather's sword in a new skyscraper which he also uses as a trap to lure Misa and Koyomi in. Yumiko goes to the building to find out what Misa is up to, and they end up fighting each other on the building roof. After a fierce battle Misa's body is pierced by Yumiko's magical swords. Misa falls unconscious and shortly afterwards her body disappears from the activation of a teleportation code in her amulet.
| 10 | "quick-and-dirty" | September 12, 2009 |
Kaho receives Misa's amulet in the mailbox and proceeds to amplify its magic with her programming skill. Guilt-laden over possibly fatally wounding Misa, Yumiko looks everywhere for her, first in her home and then in Akihabara. Koyomi, Soushirou, and Kaho also start looking for Misa in Akihabara, where they run into Gary Huang and Jean-Jacques Guibarthez, whose evil plan is to revive the legendary sorceress Digitalis Flammalacia.
| 11 | "Dragon Book" | September 19, 2009 |
Misa's ghostscript appears to help Soushirou and Yumiko battle Gary Huang and Jean-Jacques Guibarthez. Yumiko is tricked into letting down her guard and is killed, resulting in the rebirth of Digitalis Flammalacia using her body. In the meantime Koyomi and Kaho find Misa still alive inside an apartment in Akihabara.
| 12 | "TMTOWTDI" | September 26, 2009 |
"There's More Than One Way To Do It"; Misa believes the best option is to send Digitalis Flammalacia into another dimension so that she can never reincarnate to do evil in this world again, but Koyomi thinks there's more than one way to do it. Harnessing the power of all the CPUs around the globe Misa's ghostscript is able to defeat Digitalis Flammalacia and opens a portal to send her away, however Koyomi holds onto her hand and won't let go. They almost fall into the portal but Soushirou brings them back. Afterwards Digitalis Flammalacia's spirit vanishes and Yumiko comes back to life.
