= Woggon =

Woggon is a surname. Notable people with the surname include:

- Bill Woggon (1911–2003), American cartoonist, brother of Elmer
- Elmer Woggon (1898–1978), American cartoonist, brother of Bill
- Ulrike Woggon (born 1958), German physicist
