= Calvary Cemetery (Seattle) =

Cemetery in Seattle, Washington, US

Coordinates: 47.667°N 122.293°W

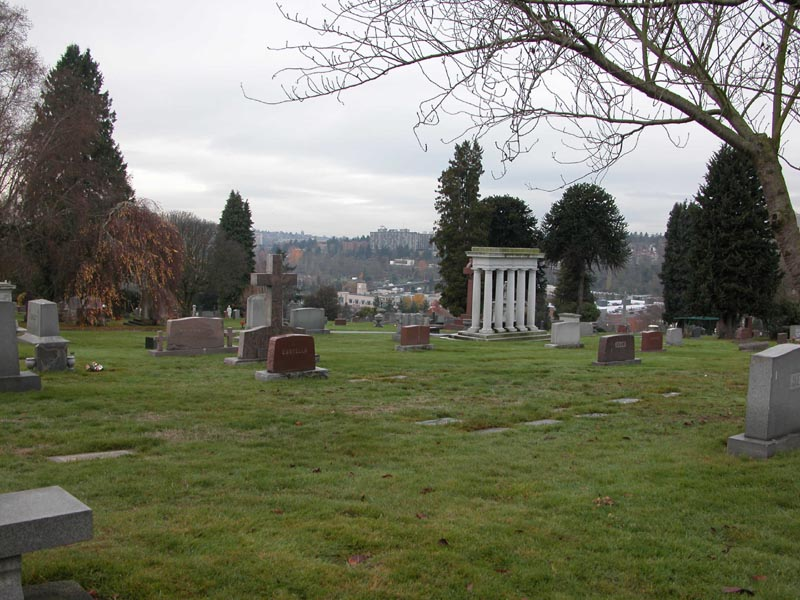
- Calvary Cemetery with University of Washington residence towers in background
- Interactive map of Calvary Cemetery

Details
- Established: December 1, 1889
- Location: Seattle, Washington
- Country: United States
- Type: Roman Catholic
- Owned by: Archdiocese of Seattle
- Size: 40 acres (16 ha)
- No. of graves: 40,000
- The Political Graveyard: Calvary Cemetery

Calvary Cemetery is a Roman Catholic cemetery in the Ravenna/Bryant neighborhood in Seattle, Washington, United States. Dedicated on December 1, 1889, it is situated on the southwest slope of a hill overlooking University Village, about a mile (1.6 km) northeast of the University of Washington. It is owned and operated by the Archdiocese of Seattle.

Covering an area of 40 acres (16 ha), the square-shaped cemetery is bounded on the north by N.E. 55th Street, on the east by 35th Avenue N.E., on the south by N.E. 50th Street, and on the west by 30th Avenue N.E.

Around 40,000 people are buried in its grounds, including:

- Dave Beck, former president of the Teamsters
- "Tioga George" Burns, baseball player, the American League's most valuable player in 1926
- John Cherberg, lieutenant governor for 32 years, UW football player and head coach
- Raymond E. Davis, Medal of Honor recipient in 1905
- Hec Edmundson, basketball and track coach at the University of Washington
- Walter Galbraith, former president of Galbraith and Co. and director of Washington Mutual
- Tubby Graves, baseball head coach at UW
- Michael J. "Moose" Heney, Alaskan railroad builder
- Al Hostak, middleweight boxer
- Jacob Nist, founder of Queen City Manufacturing Company, now the Seattle-Tacoma Box Company
- Albert Rosellini, former governor

Additionally, priests of the Archdiocese of Seattle and clergy from a number of religious orders are buried at the cemetery. There is one British Commonwealth war grave, of a Canadian Army soldier of World War I.

Monument to Saint Frances Xavier Cabrini at Calvary Cemetery
