= Steven Cundiff =

American physicist

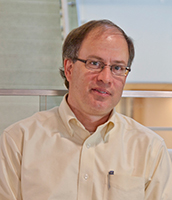
- Education: Michigan (Ph.D., M.S.); Rutgers University (B.A.)
- Known for: Dropleton; Frequency Combs; Ultrafast Spectroscopy; Coherent control
- Awards: Arthur L. Schawlow Prize (2019); DOC Silver Medal (2013); William F. Meggers Award (2011); Humboldt Research Award (2010); DOC Group Bronze Medal (2009); DOC Group Gold Medal (2001)
- Scientific career
- Fields: Applied Physics
- Workplaces: Michigan (2015–); University of Colorado; NIST
- Thesis: Picosecond excitonic optical nonlinearities: The effects of disorder in quantum wells. (1992)
- Doctoral advisor: Duncan G. Steel

Steven Cundiff is an American experimental physicist and the Harrison M. Randall collegiate professor of physics at the University of Michigan. His research interests include the production and manipulation of ultrafast pulses, in particular for applications in studying light–matter interactions. Cundiff is a Fellow of the American Association for the Advancement of Science, the American Physical Society, the Optical Society of America, and the Institute of Electrical and Electronics Engineers. He is the co-author (with Jun Ye) of the standard reference for frequency combs titled Femtosecond Optical Frequency Comb: Principle, Operation and Applications. He is coauthor with Hebin Li, Bachana Lomsadze, Christopher Smallwood, and Galan Moody of "Optical Multidimensional Coherent Spectroscopy".

== Research ==
Cundiff's research interests broadly encompasses nonlinear light–matter interactions and advancing ultrafast optical technologies.

=== Multi-Dimensional Coherent Spectroscopy (MDCS) ===
Multi-dimensional coherent optical spectroscopy (MDCS) is an analogue of NMR spectroscopy at optical frequencies. Initially MDCS was primarily applied to study of molecular systems, but the Cundiff research group pioneered its application to atomic vapors and semiconductor nanostructures.

In the Cundiff group's study of atomic vapors using MDCS, notable results include direct detection of doubly-excited states induced by dipole-dipole interactions and an advance, via acquisition of three-dimensional spectra, towards complete characterization of the atomic vapor Hamiltonian.

A main focus of Cundiff has been the application of MDCS to spectroscopy of semiconductor nanostructures, and his group has achieved several milestones. In quantum well nanostructures, MDCS was applied towards elucidating exciton many-body interactions. In epitaxial quantum dots, MDCS enabled coherent control of the exciton population in the presence of inhomogeneous broadening. In interfacial quantum dots MDCS revealed induced inter-dot interactions mediated by excitation of delocalized well states, offering the possibility of another form of coherent control.

== Early life and education ==
Steven Cundiff graduated from Rutgers University with a B.A. in physics in 1985. Following graduation, he took a position as associate scientist at SciTec, Inc. in Princeton, New Jersey, where he remained from 1985 to 1987. Cundiff then returned to school at the University of Michigan, graduating with an M.S. and Ph.D. in Applied Physics in 1991 and 1992 respectively. His dissertation, Picosecond excitonic optical nonlinearities: The effects of disorder in quantum wells., was supervised by Duncan G. Steel. From 1993 to 1994 he was a postdoctoral researcher at the University of Marburg, and from 1995 to 1997 he was a member of the technical staff at Bell Laboratories.

== Career ==
In 1997, Cundiff joined the Quantum Physics division at NIST as a staff member as well as an Adjoint Assistant Professor of the University of Colorado, Boulder. From 2004 to 2009 he served as chief of the Quantum Physics division at NIST, and in 2016 he assumed the position of Harrison M. Randall collegiate professor of physics at the University of Michigan.

== Selected publications ==
- B. Lomsadze; B. C. Smith & S. T. Cundiff (22 October 2018). "Tri-comb spectroscopy". Nature Photonics. 12 (11): 676–680. arXiv:1806.05071. Bibcode:2018NaPho..12..676L. doi:10.1038/s41566-018-0267-4. S2CID 119536516.
- B. Lomsadze & S. T. Cundiff (29 September 2017). "Frequency combs enable rapid and high-resolution multidimensional coherent spectroscopy". Science. 357 (6358): 1389–1391. Bibcode:2017Sci...357.1389L. doi:10.1126/science.aao1090. PMID 28963253.
- T. Suzuki; R. Singh; M. Bayer; A. Ludwig; A. D. Wieck & S. T. Cundiff (6 October 2016). "Coherent Control of the Exciton-Biexciton System in an InAs Self-Assembled Quantum Dot Ensemble". Physical Review Letters. 117 (15) 157402. Bibcode:2016PhRvL.117o7402S. doi:10.1103/PhysRevLett.117.157402. PMID 27768374.
- A. E. Almand-Hunter; H. Li; S. T. Cundiff; M. Mootz; M. Kira & S. W. Koch (27 February 2014). "Quantum droplets of electrons and holes". Nature. 506 (7489): 471–475. Bibcode:2014Natur.506..471A. doi:10.1038/nature12994. PMID 24572422. S2CID 4453076.
- X. Li; T. Zhang; C. N. Borca & S. T. Cundiff (7 February 2006). "Many-Body Interactions in Semiconductors Probed by Optical Two-Dimensional Fourier Transform Spectroscopy". Physical Review Letters. 96 (5) 057406. Bibcode:2006PhRvL..96e7406L. doi:10.1103/PhysRevLett.96.057406. PMID 16486986.
- D. J. Jones; S. A. Diddams; J. K. Ranka; A. Stentz; R. S. Windeler; J. L. Hall & S. T. Cundiff (28 April 2000). "Carrier-Envelope Phase Control of Femtosecond Mode-Locked Lasers and Direct Optical Frequency Synthesis". Science. 288 (5466): 635–639. Bibcode:2000Sci...288..635J. doi:10.1126/science.288.5466.635. PMID 10784441.
