= Alfred Aho =

Canadian computer scientist (born 1941)

- Born: Alfred Vaino Aho; August 9, 1941 (age 85); Timmins, Ontario, Canada
- Education: University of Toronto (BASc); Princeton University (MA, PhD)
- Known for: Awk programming language; Principles of Compiler Design; Compilers: Principles, Techniques, and Tools; Aho-Corasick algorithm
- Awards: Bell Labs Fellow (1984); FAAAS (1986); IEEE Fellow (1988); FACM (1996); IEEE John von Neumann Medal (2003); NAE Member; NAS Member; Turing Award (2020)
- Scientific career
- Fields: Computer science
- Workplaces: Columbia University
- Thesis: Indexed Grammars: An Extension of Context Free Grammars (1968)
- Doctoral advisor: John Hopcroft
- Doctoral students: Krysta Svore

Alfred Vaino Aho (born August 9, 1941) is a Canadian computer scientist best known for his work on programming languages, compilers, and related algorithms, and his textbooks on the art and science of computer programming.

Aho was elected into the National Academy of Engineering in 1999 for his contributions to the fields of algorithms and programming tools.

He and his long-time collaborator Jeffrey Ullman are the recipients of the 2020 Turing Award, generally recognized as the highest distinction in computer science.

== Career ==
Aho received a B.A.Sc. (1963) in Engineering Physics from the University of Toronto, then an M.A. (1965) and Ph.D. (1967) in Electrical Engineering/Computer Science from Princeton University. He conducted research at Bell Labs from 1967 to 1991, and again from 1997 to 2002 as Vice President of the Computing Sciences Research Center. Since 1995, he has held the Lawrence Gussman Professorship in Computer Science at Columbia University. He served as chair of the department from 1995 to 1997, and again in the spring of 2003.

In his PhD thesis Aho created indexed grammars and the nested-stack automaton as vehicles for extending the power of context-free languages, but retaining many of their decidability and closure properties. One application of indexed grammars is modelling parallel rewriting systems, particularly in biological applications.

After graduating from Princeton, Aho joined the Computing Sciences Research Center at Bell Labs where he devised efficient regular expression and string-pattern matching algorithms that he implemented in the first versions of the Unix tools egrep and fgrep. The fgrep algorithm has become known as the Aho–Corasick algorithm; it is used by several bibliographic search-systems, including the one developed by Margaret J. Corasick, and by other string-searching applications.

At Bell Labs, Aho worked closely with Steve Johnson and Jeffrey Ullman to develop efficient algorithms for analyzing and translating programming languages. Steve Johnson used the bottom-up LALR parsing algorithms to create the syntax-analyzer generator yacc, and Michael E. Lesk and Eric Schmidt used Aho's regular-expression pattern-matching algorithms to create the lexical-analyzer generator lex. The lex and yacc tools and their derivatives have been used to develop the front ends of many of today's programming language compilers.

Aho and Ullman wrote a series of textbooks on compiling techniques that codified the theory relevant to compiler design. Their 1977 textbook Principles of Compiler Design had a green dragon on the front cover and became known as "the green dragon book". In 1986 Aho and Ullman were joined by Ravi Sethi to create a new edition, "the red dragon book" (which was briefly shown in the 1995 movie Hackers), and in 2006 also by Monica Lam to create "the purple dragon book". The dragon books are used for university courses as well as industry references.

In 1974, Aho, John Hopcroft, and Ullman wrote The Design and Analysis of Computer Algorithms, codifying some of their early research on algorithms. This book became one of the most highly cited books in computer science for several decades and helped to stimulate the creation of algorithms and data structures as a central course in the computer science curriculum.

Aho is also widely known for his co-authorship of the AWK programming language with Peter J. Weinberger and Brian Kernighan (the "A" stands for "Aho"). As of 2010 Aho's research interests include programming languages, compilers, algorithms, and quantum computing. He is part of the Language and Compilers research-group at Columbia University.

Overall, his works have been cited 81,040 times and he has an h-index of 66, as of May 8, 2019.

Aho has received many prestigious honors, including the IEEE's John von Neumann Medal and membership in the National Academy of Engineering and the National Academy of Sciences. He was elected a Fellow of the American Academy of Arts and Sciences in 2003. He holds honorary doctorates from the University of Waterloo, from the University of Helsinki, and from the University of Toronto. He is a Fellow of the American Association for the Advancement of Science, ACM, Bell Labs, and IEEE.

Aho has twice served as chair of the Advisory Committee for the Computer and Information Science and Engineering Directorate of the National Science Foundation. He is a past president of the ACM Special Interest Group on Algorithms and Computability Theory. Aho, Hopcroft, and Ullman were co-recipients of the 2017 C&C Prize awarded by NEC Corporation. He and Ullman were named recipients of the 2020 Turing Award on March 31, 2021.

== Personal life ==
Aho has taught at Columbia University in New York City since 1995. He won the Great Teacher Award from the Society of Columbia Graduates in 2003.

== Books ==
- A. V. Aho and J. D. Ullman, The Theory of Parsing, Translation, and Compiling, Vol. 1, Parsing. Prentice Hall, 1972. ISBN 0-13-914556-7
- A. V. Aho (ed.) Currents in the Theory of Computing. Prentice Hall, 1973. ISBN 0-13-195651-5
- A. V. Aho and J. D. Ullman, The Theory of Parsing, Translation, and Compiling, Vol. 2, Compiling. Prentice-Hall, 1973. ISBN 978-0-13-914564-3
- Aho, Alfred V.; Hopcroft, John E.; Ullman, Jeffrey D. (1974). The Design and Analysis of Computer Algorithms. Addison-Wesley. ISBN 978-0-201-00029-0.
- A. V. Aho and J. D. Ullman, Principles of Compiler Design. Addison-Wesley, 1977. ISBN 0-201-00022-9
- A. V. Aho, J. E. Hopcroft, J. D. Ullman, Data Structures and Algorithms. Addison-Wesley, 1983. ISBN 0-201-00023-7
- A. V. Aho, R. Sethi, J. D. Ullman, Compilers: Principles, Techniques, and Tools. Addison-Wesley, Reading MA 1986. ISBN 0-201-10088-6
- A. V. Aho, B. W. Kernighan, and P. J. Weinberger, The AWK Programming Language. Addison-Wesley, 1988. ISBN 978-0-201-07981-4
- A. V. Aho and J. D. Ullman, Foundations of Computer Science. W. H. Freeman/Computer Science Press, 1992. ISBN 978-0-7167-8233-9
  - A. V. Aho and J. D. Ullman, Foundations of Computer Science, C Edition. W. H. Freeman, 1995. ISBN 978-0-7167-8284-1
- A. V. Aho, M. S. Lam, R. Sethi, and J. D. Ullman, Compilers: Principles, Techniques, and Tools, Second Edition. Addison-Wesley, 2007. ISBN 978-0-321-48681-3
