= Jacob Nist =

American businessman (1839–1907)

Jacob Michael Nist
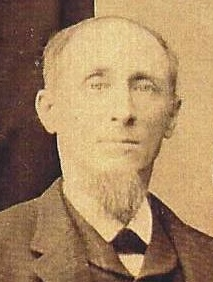
- Born: March 28, 1839; Louisville, Kentucky, U.S.
- Died: August 5, 1907 (aged 68); Seattle, Washington, U.S.
- Resting place: Calvary Cemetery, Seattle
- Occupation: Businessman
- Known for: Founder, Queen City Box ManufacturingCompany (now: Seattle-Tacoma Box Company)

Jacob Michael Nist (March 28, 1839 – August 5, 1907) was a pioneering Seattle-based American businessman who established a container manufacturing company. Nist's company has been continuously owned and operated by six generations of the Nist family since 1889. A century after the founding of Queen City Box Manufacturing Company, Washington's Governor Booth Gardner honored Nist and his family, proclaiming October 23, 1989, to be "Nist Family Day", citing the company's contributions to the state's economy.

As of 2015, the Seattle-Tacoma Box Company is an international company producing containers, storage vaults and packaging, with headquarters in Kent, Washington, as well as operations in Alaska, California, Hawaii, Oregon, and New Zealand.

== Early years ==
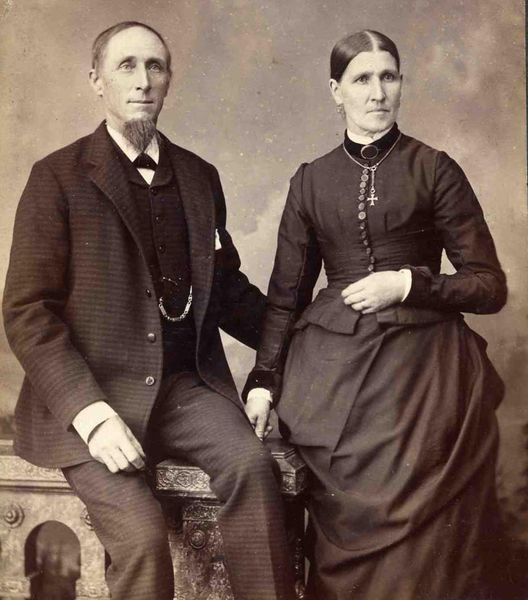
Portrait of Jacob and Mary Nist

Nist was born in Louisville, Kentucky, the son of Joseph and Katharina Minnich Nist. Before 1850 his parents moved the family from Kentucky to the Colony of St. Mary's, a community of German Catholic settlers in Benzinger Township, Elk County, Pennsylvania. Nist married Mary Anna Wagner on October 15, 1860, in Pittsburgh, Pennsylvania, where he farmed for almost two decades and was a grocer. Their nine children were born in Pittsburgh: Michael, Mary Margaret and Barbara (who both died in early childhood), George, Jacob, John, Aloysius, Joseph and Anna. When Nist was 39 years old, the family moved to Beaver, Kansas, where he farmed and had a mercantile business.

== Later years ==
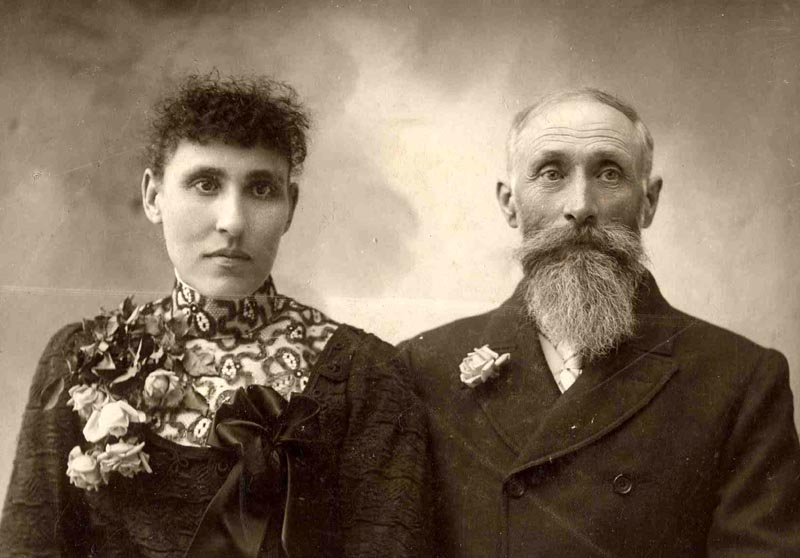
Wedding portrait of Jacob and Josephine Nist

By late 1880, the Nist family had moved to Seattle, Washington, where he worked as a carpenter at the Seattle Lumber and Commercial Company. When that company was destroyed in the Great Seattle Fire on June 6, 1889, Nist and his son Michael launched Queen City Box Manufacturing next to his home on the Northeast corner of Thomas and Rollin, which later became Westlake Avenue North.

Honoring the family's Catholic religious faith, two of Nist's sons joined the Redemptorist ministry. Brother Raymond (John A. Nist) served parishes in Baltimore, Maryland, and Ephrata, Pennsylvania. Brother Silverius (Joseph Franz Nist) served in Baltimore, Buffalo, Boston, and Philadelphia.

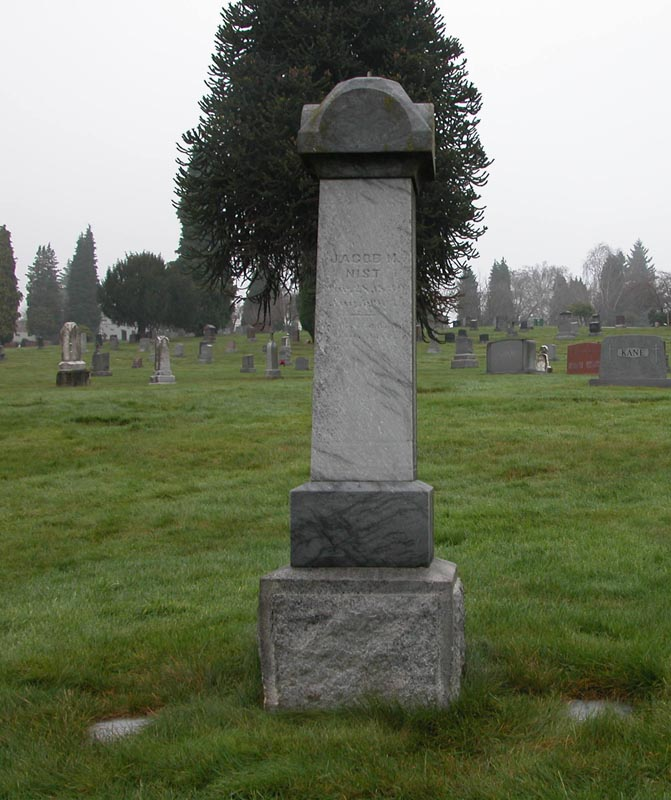
Jacob Nist's Tombstone

After the death of his wife Mary Ann on November 11, 1897, Nist married Josephine Webber Clavadetscher on August 22, 1900, and his youngest daughter Catherine was born in 1902. John Hopcroft, his grandson from that second marriage, is a renowned theoretical computer scientist.

When Jacob Nist constructed a new house in 1906 at 221 6th Avenue N., he installed both gas and electric lighting, as he believed electricity was too new to be trusted. The house was demolished between 1929 and 1931 to make way for the second Denny regrade.

Nist is buried between his wives, Mary on his left and Josephine on his right, as inscribed on the tombstone at Calvary Cemetery in the Ravenna neighborhood of Seattle, Washington.

== Nist's family-owned company ==
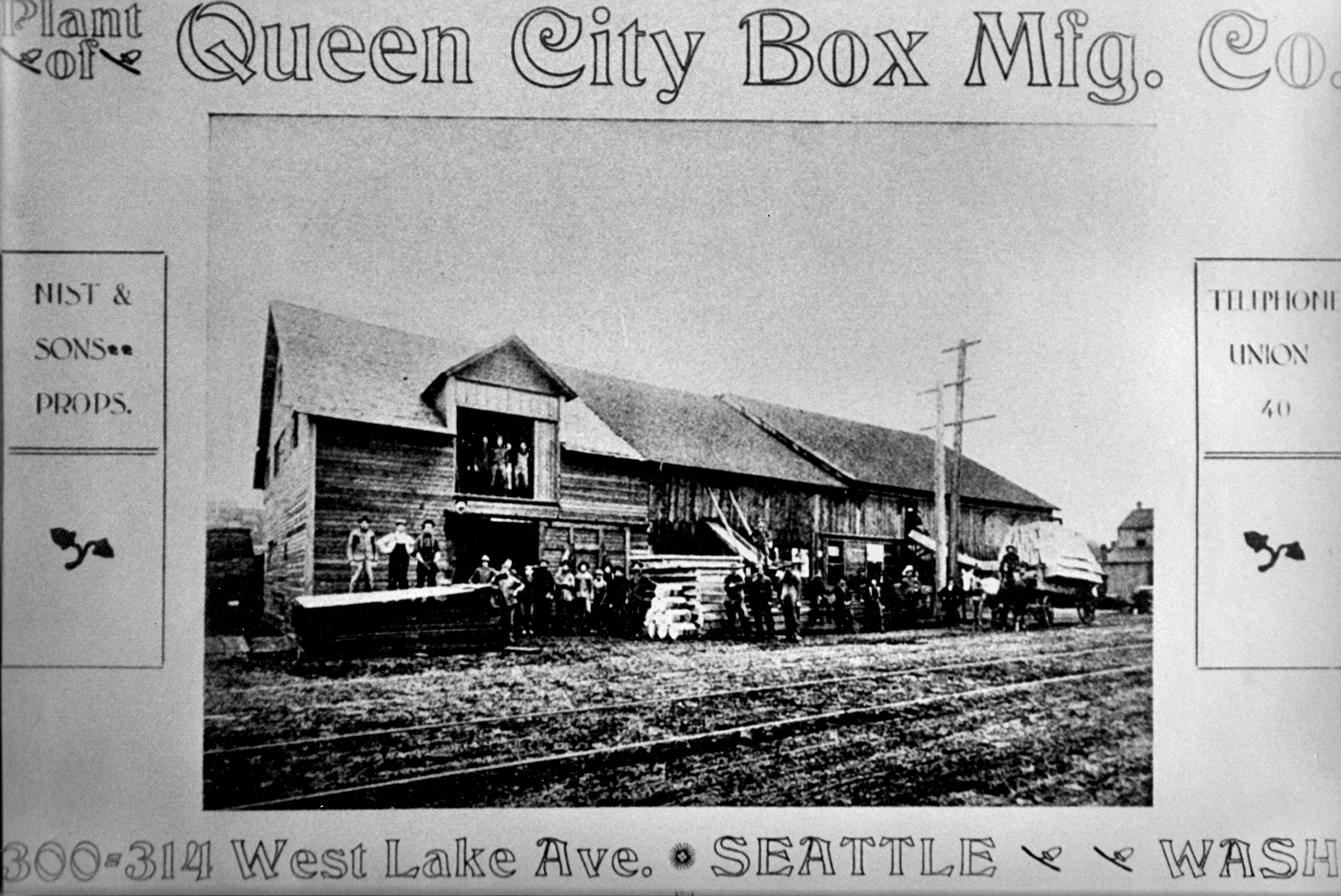
Queen City Box Manufacturing Company

Queen City Box Manufacturing had expanded its operations by 1903 to include a mining effort in Whatcom County, Washington, with the purchase of a mine formerly owned by the Horseshoe Mining Company.

Sixteen years after the founding of the family business, Nist's eldest son Michael took over the company in 1905, moved it to the southeast corner of 4th Avenue S. and S. Spokane Street in the industrial district, and renamed it the Seattle Box Company, the precursor of Seattle-Tacoma Box Company.

By 1930 the company had survived significant challenges, including four fires, the Great Depression of 1929, and the six-day Seattle General Strike of 1919. These and other challenges, according to one analyst, "would jeopardize the company's very existence. Yet the Company endured and has evolved into the multifaceted organization that exists today as Seattle-Tacoma Box Co."

== Nist Family Day Proclamation ==
The governor's 1989 proclamation celebrated Nist and his family for many reasons, including the following:

- Whereas, in 1889, Jacob Nist founded the Queen City Box Manufacturing Company located on Westlake Avenue; and
- Whereas, the great-grandsons of Jacob Nist, Emmett, Eugene and Ferdinand, as well as the great-great-grandsons, Michael and Robert, are fully involved in the company today; and
- Whereas, this year the Nist family celebrates 100 years of continuous ownership of the Seattle-Tacoma Box Company in Kent; and
- Whereas, the citizens of the State of Washington are proud of the accomplishments of the Nist family and of their contributions to the economy of our state;

Now, therefore, I, Booth Gardner, Governor of the State of Washington, do hereby proclaim October 23, 1989, as Nist Family Day.
