= List of foreign members of the Chinese Academy of Sciences =

Persons who are not Chinese citizens but are distinguished in their scientific or engineering work are recognized by the Chinese Academy of Sciences (CAS) through election as a foreign member.

Recently elected foreign members of the CAS include:

Country	Name	Organization
Pakistan	Atta-ur-Rahman	University of Karachi
Egypt	Ahmed Hassan Zewail	California Institute of Technology
Israel	Aaron Ciechanover	Technion – Israel Institute of Technology
Netherlands / United Kingdom	Sir Andre Konstantinovich Geim FRS, HonFRSC, HonFInstP	University of Manchester
Sweden	Anders Lindquist	University of California, Los Angeles
Sweden	Deliang Chen	University of Gothenburg
United Kingdom	Paul Nurse	Francis Crick Institute
United Kingdom	Simon White	Max Planck Institute
United States	Alfred Y. Cho	Bell Labs
United States	David Gross	University of California, Santa Barbara
United States	Robert H. Grubbs ForMemRS	California Institute of Technology
United States	Alan J. Heeger	University of Pennsylvania / University of California, Santa Barbara
United States	John Hopcroft	Cornell University
United States	Yonggang Huang	Northwestern University
United States	Charles M. Lieber	Harvard University
United States	Kuo-Nan Liou	University of California, Los Angeles
United States	Steven Gwon Sheng Louie	University of California, Berkeley
United States	Chad Mirkin	Northwestern University
United States	Vincent Poor	Princeton University
United States	Sir James Fraser Stoddart FRS FRSE FRSC	Northwestern University
United States	Subra Suresh	Carnegie Mellon University
South Africa	Tshilidzi Marwala	University of Johannesburg
United States	Jun Ye	National Institute of Standards and Technology / University of Colorado Boulder
