= Introduction to Automata Theory, Languages, and Computation =

1979 computer science textbook

- Cover of the Cinderella Book (1979 edition)
- Author: John Hopcroft and Jeffrey Ullman
- Language: English
- Subject: Computer science
- Publisher: Addison-Wesley
- Publication date: 1979
- Publication place: USA
- Media type: Print
- ISBN: 0-201-02988-X
- OCLC: 4549363
- Dewey Decimal: 629.8/312
- LC Class: QA267 .H56

Introduction to Automata Theory, Languages, and Computation is an influential computer science textbook by John Hopcroft and Jeffrey Ullman on formal languages and the theory of computation. Rajeev Motwani contributed to later editions beginning in 2000.

== Nickname ==
The Jargon File records the book's nickname, Cinderella Book, thusly: "So called because the cover depicts a girl (putatively Cinderella) sitting in front of a Rube Goldberg device and holding a rope coming out of it. On the back cover, the device is in shambles after she has (inevitably) pulled on the rope."

== Edition history and reception ==
The forerunner of this book appeared under the title Formal Languages and Their Relation to Automata in 1969. Forming a basis both for the creation of courses on the topic, as well as for further research, that book shaped the field of automata theory for over a decade.

- Hopcroft, John E.; Ullman, Jeffrey D. (1969). Formal Languages and Their Relation to Automata. Addison-Wesley. ISBN 9780201029833.
- Hopcroft, John E.; Ullman, Jeffrey D. (1979). Introduction to Automata Theory, Languages, and Computation (1st ed.). Addison-Wesley. ISBN 0-201-02988-X.
- Hopcroft, John E.; Motwani, Rajeev; Ullman, Jeffrey D. (2000). Introduction to Automata Theory, Languages, and Computation (2nd ed.). Addison-Wesley. ISBN 81-7808-347-7.
- Hopcroft, John E.; Motwani, Rajeev; Ullman, Jeffrey D. (2006) [1979]. Introduction to Automata Theory, Languages, and Computation (3rd ed.). Addison-Wesley. ISBN 0-321-45536-3.
- Hopcroft, John E.; Motwani, Rajeev; Ullman, Jeffrey D. (2013). Introduction to Automata Theory, Languages, and Computation (New International ed.). Pearson. ISBN 978-1292039053.

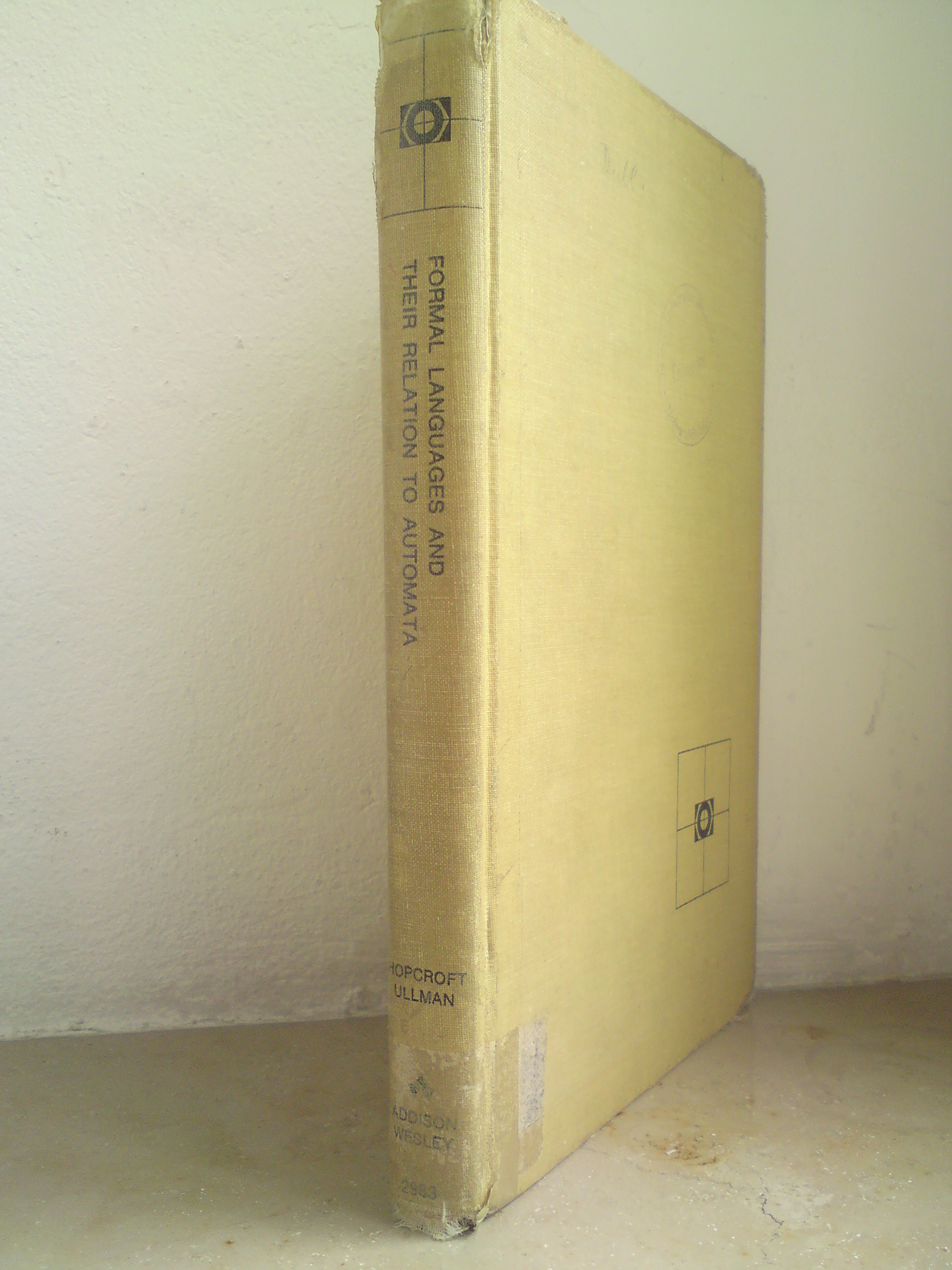
Formal Languages and Their Relation to Automata (1969) without a dust jacket

The first edition of Introduction to Automata Theory, Languages, and Computation was published in 1979, the second edition in November 2000, and the third edition appeared in February 2006. Since the second edition, Rajeev Motwani has joined Hopcroft and Ullman as the third author. Starting with the second edition, the book features extended coverage of examples where automata theory is applied, whereas large parts of more advanced theory were taken out. While this makes the second and third editions more accessible to beginners, it makes it less suited for more advanced courses. The new bias away from theory is not seen positively by all: As Shallit quotes one professor, "they have removed all good parts."

The first edition in turn constituted a major revision of a previous textbook also written by Hopcroft and Ullman, entitled Formal Languages and Their Relation to Automata. It was published in 1969 and is referred to in the introduction of the 1979 edition. In a personal historical note regarding the 1969 book, Hopcroft states: "Perhaps the success of the book came from our efforts to present the essence of each proof before actually giving the proof". Compared with the forerunner book, the 1979 edition was expanded, and the material was reworked to make it more accessible to students. This gearing towards understandability at the price of succinctness was not seen positively by all. As Hopcroft reports on feedback to the overhauled 1979 edition: "It seems that our attempts to lower the level of our presentation for the benefit of students by including more detail and explanations had an adverse effect on the faculty, who then had to sift through the added material to outline and prepare their lectures".

Still, the most cited edition of the book is apparently the 1979 edition: According to the website CiteSeerX, over 3000 scientific papers freely available online cite this edition of the book.

== See also ==
- Introduction to the Theory of Computation by Michael Sipser, another standard textbook in the field
- Solutions to Selected Exercises, Stanford University
