= Duncan G. Steel =

American physicist

Duncan Gregory Steel
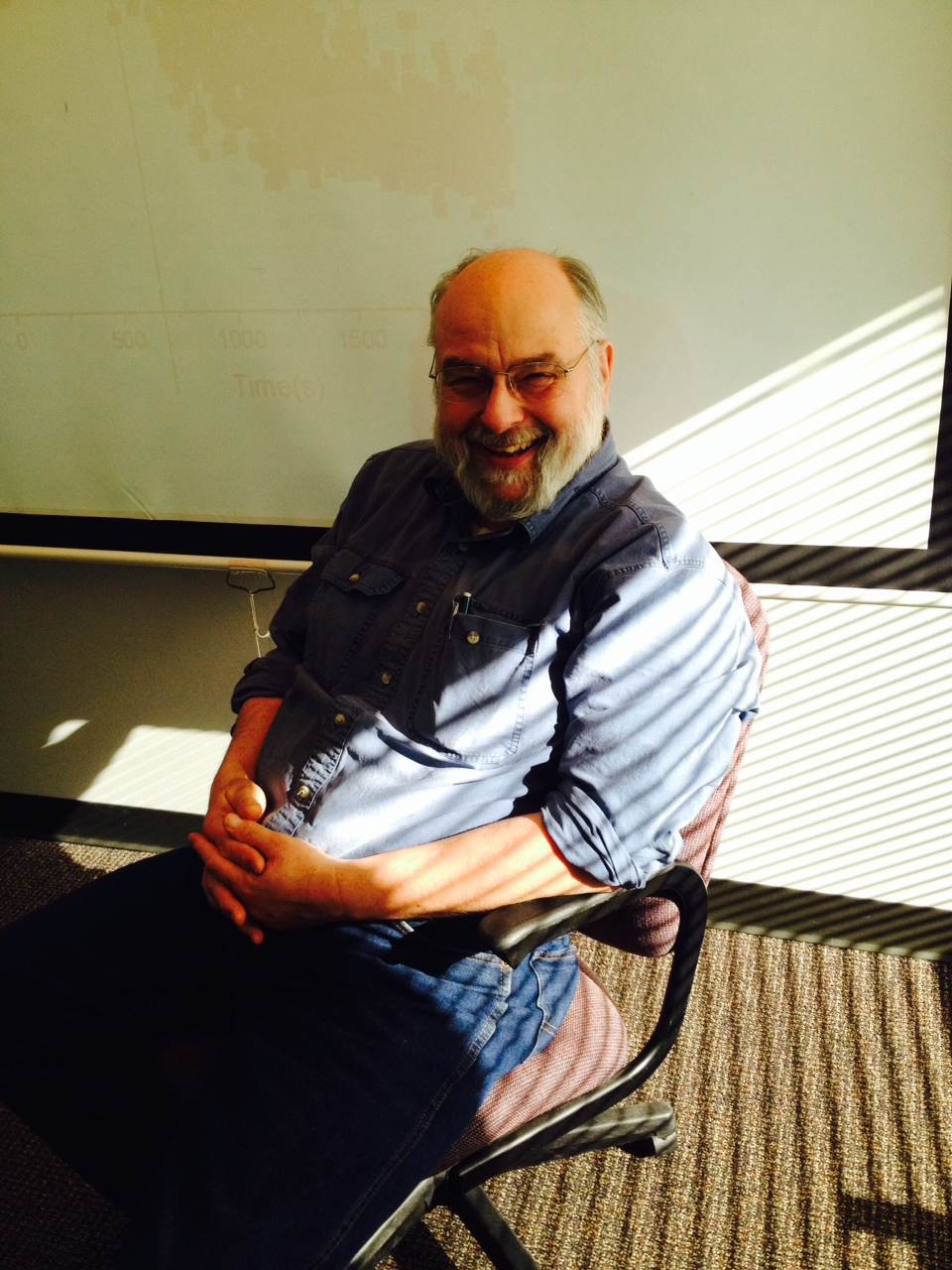
- Born: 1951 (age 74–75)
- Education: Michigan (Ph.D.); UNC–Chapel Hill (A.B.)
- Awards: Guggenheim Fellow; Fellow of the American Physical Society
- Scientific career
- Fields: Physics
- Workplaces: University of Michigan (1985–); HRL Laboratories
- Thesis: Intense Carbon-dioxide Laser Interactions With A Dense Helium Z-pinch Plasma (1976)
- Doctoral advisor: James Duderstadt
- Doctoral students: Steven Cundiff; Xiaoqin Li

Duncan Gregory Steel (born 1951) is an American experimental physicist, researcher and professor in quantum optics in condensed matter physics. He is the Robert J. Hiller Professor of Electrical Engineering, Professor of Physics, Professor of Biophysics, and research professor in the Institute of Gerontology at the University of Michigan. Steel is also a Guggenheim Scholar and a Fellow of American Physical Society, the Optical Society of America, and the Institute of Electrical and Electronics Engineers. He coedited the five-volume series on the Encyclopedia of Modern Optics.

== Education ==
Steel graduated from the University of North Carolina, Chapel Hill with an A.B. in 1972. Graduated from the University of Michigan with a Ph.D. in 1976. Prior to joining the faculty at Michigan, he was a Member of the Technical Staff and Senior Staff Physicist for the Hughes Aircraft Company at the Hughes Research Labs (HRL) in Malibu. There he worked on optical phase conjugation and real time holography. Working with Richard Lind, they demonstrated the first laser with a phase conjugate mirror using degenerate four-wave mixing.

== Research ==
Steel works on nonlinear optical spectroscopy and coherent control of semiconductor heterostructures, for which he received 2010 Frank Isakson Prize for Optical Effects in Solids from the American Physical Society. His research focus is on using ultrafast optical techniques to manipulate electron spins embedded in semiconductor quantum dots to create quantum coherence as a new degree of freedom. Some of his publications describe the first demonstration of an optically driven CNOT gate in a solid state device and demonstration of entanglement in semiconductor system. In addition to semiconductor physics, he is also involved in the development and application of advanced laser spectroscopy methodology and other biophysical techniques for the study of protein folding and dynamics.
