= Surajit Chaudhuri =

Indian-American computer scientist

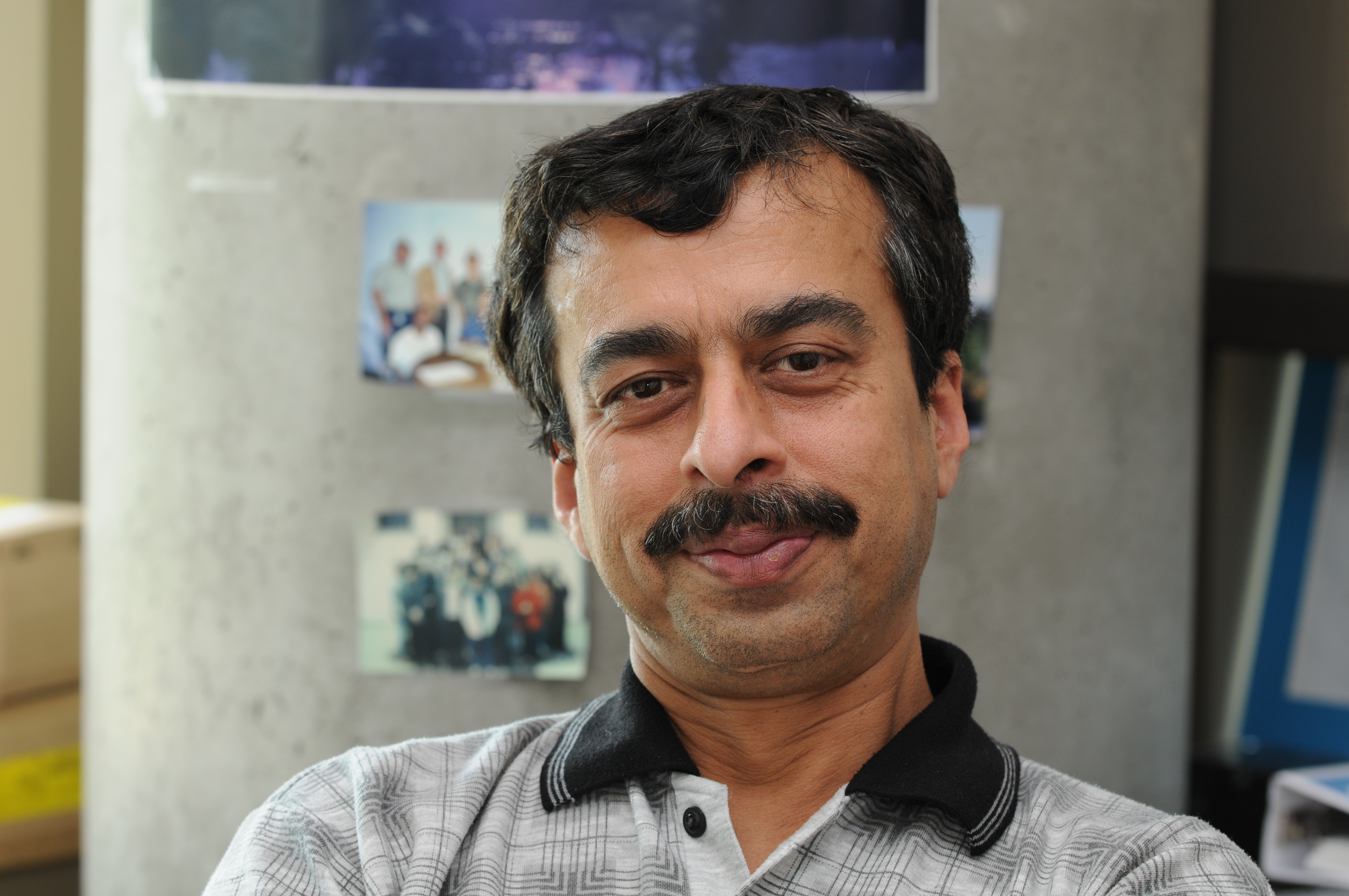
- Chaudhuri at his office in 2009
- Education: IIT Kharagpur; Stanford University (PhD)
- Scientific career
- Fields: Database management systems
- Workplaces: Microsoft Research; Hewlett-Packard

Surajit Chaudhuri is an Indian-American computer scientist notable for his contributions to database management systems. He is currently a distinguished scientist at Microsoft Research, where he leads the Data Management, Exploration and Mining group. Chaudhuri is an ACM Fellow.

== Education ==
He received his B.Tech. from Indian Institutes of Technology (IIT), Kharagpur, and his Ph.D. in computer science from Stanford University in 1991 under Jeffrey Ullman. From 1992 to 1995, he has worked at HP Labs, Palo Alto.
