= Jeffrey Ullman =

American computer scientist

- Born: November 22, 1942 (age 83)
- Education: Columbia University (BS); Princeton University (MS, PhD)
- Known for: database theory, database systems, formal language theory
- Awards: ACM Fellow (1994); Knuth Prize (2000); IEEE John von Neumann Medal (2010); Turing Award (2020)
- Scientific career
- Workplaces: Stanford University
- Thesis: Synchronization Error Correcting Codes (1966)
- Doctoral advisor: Arthur Bernstein, Archie McKellar
- Doctoral students: Surajit Chaudhuri; Dan Hirschberg; Anna Karlin; Kevin Karplus; David Maier; Harry Mairson; Alberto O. Mendelzon; Jeffrey F. Naughton; Anand Rajaraman; Yehoshua Sagiv; Ravi Sethi; Mihalis Yannakakis

Jeffrey David Ullman (born November 22, 1942) is an American computer scientist and the Stanford W. Ascherman Professor of Engineering, Emeritus, at Stanford University. His textbooks on compilers (various editions are popularly known as the dragon book), theory of computation (also known as the Cinderella book), data structures, and databases are regarded as standards in their fields. He and his long-time collaborator Alfred Aho are the recipients of the 2020 Turing Award, generally recognized as the highest distinction in computer science.

== Career ==
Ullman received a Bachelor of Science degree in engineering mathematics from Columbia University in 1963 and his PhD in electrical engineering from Princeton University in 1966. He then worked for three years at Bell Labs. In 1969, he returned to Princeton as an associate professor, and was promoted to full professor in 1974. Ullman moved to Stanford University in 1979, and served as the department chair from 1990 to 1994. He was named the Stanford W. Ascherman Professor of Computer Science in 1994, and became an Emeritus in 2003.

In 1994 Ullman was inducted as a Fellow of the Association for Computing Machinery; in 2000 he was awarded the Knuth Prize. Ullman is the co-recipient (with John Hopcroft) of the 2010 IEEE John von Neumann Medal "For laying the foundations for the fields of automata and language theory and many seminal contributions to theoretical computer science." Ullman, Hopcroft, and Alfred Aho were co-recipients of the 2017 C&C Prize awarded by NEC Corporation.

Ullman's research interests include database theory, data integration, data mining, and education using online infrastructure. He is one of the founders of the field of database theory: many of his Ph.D. students became influential in the field as well. He was the Ph.D. advisor of Sergey Brin, one of the co-founders of Google, and served on Google's technical advisory board. He is the founder of Gradiance Corporation, which provides homework grading support for college courses. He teaches courses on automata and mining massive datasets on the Stanford Online learning platform.

Ullman was elected as a member of the National Academy of Sciences in 2020. He also sits on the advisory board of TheOpenCode Foundation. On March 31, 2021, he and Aho were named recipients of the 2020 Turing Award.

== Controversies ==
In 2011, Ullman stated his opposition to assisting Iranians in becoming graduate students at Stanford, because of the anti-Israel position of the Iranian government. In response to a call by the National Iranian American Council for disciplinary action against Ullman for what they described as his "racially discriminatory and inflammatory" comments, a Stanford spokesperson stated that Ullman was expressing his personal views and not the views of the university, and that he was uninvolved in admissions.

In April 2021, an open letter by CSForInclusion criticized the ACM and the ACM A.M. Turing Award Committee for nominating and selecting Ullman as the recipient of the ACM A.M. Turing award. ACM reconfirmed its commitments to inclusion and diversity in a response to the letter.

== Books ==
- Mining of massive datasets (with Jure Leskovec and Anand Rajaraman), Prentice-Hall, Second edition 2014. ISBN 978-1-1070-7723-2
- Database Systems: The Complete Book (with H. Garcia-Molina and J. Widom), Prentice-Hall, Englewood Cliffs, New Jersey, 2002. ISBN 978-0-1303-1995-1
- Introduction to Automata Theory, Languages, and Computation, (with J. E. Hopcroft and R. Motwani), Addison-Wesley, Reading, Massachusetts, 1969, 1979 (ISBN 978-0-2010-2988-8), 2000.
- Elements of ML Programming, Prentice-Hall, Englewood Cliffs, New Jersey, 1993, 1998. ISBN 978-0-13-790387-0
- A First Course in Database Systems (with J. Widom), Prentice-Hall, Englewood Cliffs, New Jersey, 1997, 2002.ISBN 978-0-13-861337-2
- Foundations of Computer Science (with A. V. Aho), Computer Science Press, New York, 1992 (ISBN 978-0-7167-8233-9). C edition, 1995 (ISBN 978-0-7167-8284-1).
- Principles of Database and Knowledge-Base Systems (two volumes), Computer Science Press, New York, 1988, 1989.
  - Volume 1: Classical Database Systems ISBN 978-0-7167-8158-5
  - Volume 2: The New Technologies ISBN 978-0-7167-8162-2
- Compilers: Principles, Techniques, and Tools (with A. V. Aho and R. Sethi), Addison-Wesley, Reading, Massachusetts, 1977, 1986.
- Computational Aspects of VLSI, Computer Science Press, 1984 ISBN 978-0-914894-95-7
- Data Structures and Algorithms (with A. V. Aho and J. E. Hopcroft), Addison-Wesley, Reading, Massachusetts, 1983. ISBN 978-0-2010-0023-8
- Principles of Compiler Design (with A. V. Aho), Addison-Wesley, Reading, Massachusetts, 1977.
- Fundamental Concepts of Programming Systems, Addison-Wesley, Reading Massachusetts, 1976. ISBN 0-201-07654-3
- The Design and Analysis of Computer Algorithms (with A. V. Aho and J. E. Hopcroft), Addison-Wesley, Reading Massachusetts, 1974. ISBN 978-0-2010-0029-0
- Formal Languages and Their Relation to Automata (with J. E. Hopcroft), Addison-Wesley, Reading Massachusetts, 1969. ISBN 978-0-2010-2983-3
