= Principles of Compiler Design =

Computer science book by Alfred Aho and Jeffrey Ullman

- Author: Alfred V. Aho, and Jeffrey D. Ullman
- Language: English
- Publisher: Addison-Wesley
- Publication date: 1977
- Pages: 614
- ISBN: 0-201-00022-9

Principles of Compiler Design, by Alfred Aho and Jeffrey Ullman, is a classic textbook on compilers for computer programming languages. Both of the authors won the 2020 Turing Award for their work on compilers.

It is often called the "green dragon book" and its cover depicts a knight and a dragon in battle; the dragon is green, and labeled "Complexity of Compiler Design", while the knight wields a lance and a shield labeled "LALR parser generator" and "Syntax Directed Translation" respectively, and rides a horse labeled "Data Flow Analysis". The book may be called the "green dragon book" to distinguish it from its successor, Aho, Sethi and Ullman's Compilers: Principles, Techniques, and Tools, which is the "red dragon book". The second edition of Compilers: Principles, Techniques, and Tools added a fourth author, Monica S. Lam, and the dragon became purple; hence becoming the "purple dragon book". The book also contains the entire code for making a compiler. The back cover offers the original inspiration of the cover design: The dragon is replaced by windmills, and the knight is Don Quixote.

The book was published in 1977 by Addison-Wesley, ISBN 0-201-00022-9. The acknowledgments mention that the book was entirely typeset at Bell Labs using troff on the Unix operating system, little of which had, at that time, been seen outside the Laboratories.
