= Compilers: Principles, Techniques, and Tools =

Computer science compiler technology textbook

- The cover of the second edition (North American), showing a knight and dragon
- Author: Alfred V. Aho, Monica S. Lam, Ravi Sethi, and Jeffrey D. Ullman
- Language: English
- Publisher: Pearson Education, Inc
- Publication date: 1986, 2006
- ISBN: 0-201-10088-6
- OCLC: 12285707
- Dewey Decimal: 005.4/53 19
- LC Class: QA76.76.C65 A37 1986

Compilers: Principles, Techniques, and Tools is a computer science textbook by Alfred V. Aho, Monica S. Lam, Ravi Sethi, and Jeffrey D. Ullman about compiler construction for programming languages. First published in 1986, it is widely regarded as the classic definitive compiler technology text.

It is known as the Dragon Book to generations of computer scientists as its cover depicts a knight and a dragon in battle, a metaphor for conquering complexity. This name can also refer to Aho and Ullman's older Principles of Compiler Design.

== First edition ==
The first edition (1986) is informally called the "red dragon book" to distinguish it from the second edition and from Aho and Ullman's 1977 Principles of Compiler Design sometimes known as the "green dragon book". Topics covered in the first edition include:

- Compiler structure
- Lexical analysis (including regular expressions and finite automata)
- Syntax analysis (including context-free grammars, LL parsers, bottom-up parsers, and LR parsers)
- Syntax-directed translation
- Type checking (including type conversions and polymorphism)
- Run-time environment (including parameter passing, symbol tables and register allocation)
- Code generation (including intermediate code generation)
- Code optimization

== Second edition ==
Following in the tradition of its two predecessors, the second edition (2006) features a dragon and a knight on its cover, and is informally known as the purple dragon. Monica S. Lam of Stanford University became a co-author with this edition.

The second edition includes several additional topics, including:

- Directed translation
- New data flow analyses
- Parallel machines
- Garbage collection
- New case studies

== Updated second edition ==
In order to cover recent developments and issues, there is an updated second edition from Pearson Education India (4 July 2023), with contributions from Sorav Bansal. This revised and updated edition has new chapters on programming language semantics and undefined behaviour semantics.

== See also ==
- Structure and Interpretation of Computer Programs
