= SeaTac (disambiguation) =

SeaTac is a common nickname for Seattle–Tacoma International Airport.

SeaTac may also refer to:

- SeaTac, Washington, a city which surrounds Seattle–Tacoma International Airport
  - SeaTac/Airport station, a light rail station in SeaTac, Washington
- Federal Detention Center, SeaTac (FDC SeaTac)
- SeaTac Mall, now known as The Commons at Federal Way, a shopping center

== See also ==
- Seattle metropolitan area, which includes Tacoma
- Seatack, Virginia, a neighborhood in Virginia Beach, Virginia
