= Stanford Online =

Educational initiative launched by Stanford University

Stanford Online is an educational initiative offered by Stanford University.

Stanford Online is an educational initiative launched by Stanford University which offers a variety of professional education opportunities. As a part of Stanford Online, Stanford University created an open access OpenEdX platform which offered a variety of massive open online courses (MOOCs) in 2013, but that site is no longer accessible. Online classes previously offered on that platform can now be accessed on an updated platform known as edx that offers a wide range of online courses covering many topics. Some of the online classes offered by Stanford Online on this platform are available free of charge. Classes can be accessed from anywhere around the world.

== History ==
Although Stanford Online was founded in 1995 through the Stanford Center for Professional Development, it has a history that spans back to the late 1960s. The start of the center began in part to the Engineering School within the University which created the university's first TV network as a new digital medium for students to take professional online courses and earn academic certificates, undergraduate and graduate degrees. Anoop Gupta was a professor of Computer Science for 11 years at Stanford University and invented the program that became integral to the formation of Stanford Online in 1996 and the first full-length online course available offered a masters a degree in Electrical Engineering.

== Structure ==
Students that complete programs engage in self-reflection throughout the process in many aspects to meet their personal goals. At Stanford Online, students are able to engage with Stanford coursework at their own pace. Students have the opportunity to enroll in complete degree programs or gain knowledge by paying to watch individual lectures. There are 12 graduate programs currently offered. The traditional Stanford University Campus application requirements and classes are consistent with the Stanford Online model. Regardless of location, any student is able to apply to Stanford Online. Stanford Online reaches students across the world. Enrolled students are able to receive academic support through Stanford Online in real-time from Stanford Faculty. Students are able to navigate the course sequentially with all of the necessary materials included in each module. There are classes available from various colleges and departments within the University available online. Stanford Online has several learning collaborations with third-party organizations to offer material tailored to students' needs.

== Financial Impacts ==
The availability of this learning format affects the financial state of Stanford in many ways. Students not yet enrolled, can participate in free courses in preparation for college at their own will. Students can also opt-in to receive premium services that in turn fund the University at large. These free courses are taught by Stanford Faculty and allow faculty to educate the broader public in this non-traditional format. The free courses offered have reached millions of people across the globe to date. Stanford was the first to introduce learning programs offered virtually. The introduction of Stanford Online provides financial stability to the University. Prices vary between degree programs. Some programs offered within Stanford Online charge reduced tuition rates if enrolled in as a group. The difficulty of the various programs progressively increases depending on the category that the course falls within in accordance with Stanford's requirements. Some of the degree programs offered online follow the same timeline as the degree program offered on the traditional campus.
