= Dropleton =

Type of quasiparticle

A dropleton or quantum droplet is a quasiparticle comprising a collection of electrons and holes inside a semiconductor. Dropletons give the first known quasiparticle characterization where the quasiparticle behaves like a liquid. The creation of dropletons was announced on 26 February 2014 in a Nature article, which presented evidence for the creation of dropletons in an electron–hole plasma inside a gallium arsenide quantum well by ultrashort laser pulses. Their existence was not predicted before the experiment.

Despite the relatively short lifetime of about 25 picoseconds, the dropletons are stable enough to be studied and possess favorable properties for certain investigations of quantum mechanics. They are approximately 200 nanometers wide, the size of the smallest bacteria, for which reason the discoverers have expressed hope that they might one day actually see quantum droplets.
