= Ulrike Woggon =

German physicist

Ulrike K. Woggon (born 1958) is a German physicist whose research involves the use of ultrafast laser spectroscopy to study low-dimensional quantum nanostructures, including quantum dots and plasmonic nanoparticles. She is a professor of nonlinear optics in the physics department at Technische Universität Berlin.

== Education and career ==
Woggon was born in Berlin, on 10 October 1958. She studied physics at the University of Jena and Humboldt University of Berlin, receiving a diploma (the German equivalent of a master's degree) from Humboldt University in 1982, and completing a doctorate (Dr. rer. nat.) in 1985.

She continued at the University of Kaiserslautern, where she received a habilitation in 1995 with a habilitation thesis on the optical properties of quantum dots that was later published as the book Optical Properties of Semiconductor Quantum Dots (Springer, Springer Tracts in Modern Physics 136, 1997).

She continued as a researcher at the University of Karlsruhe and the University of Arizona before, in 1997, taking a professorship in experimental physics at the Technical University of Dortmund. She moved to TU Berlin in 2008.

== Recognition ==
Woggon was named as a Fellow of Optica in 2010, "for seminal contributions to ultrafast spectroscopy and nano-optics of nanocrystals and quantum dots, and the demonstration of quantum optical principles with semiconductor nanostructures".
