= Ravi Sethi =

Indian computer scientist

- Education: Indian Institute of Technology, Kanpur; Princeton University
- Scientific career
- Institutions: Penn State University; Bell Labs; Avaya Labs Research; University of Arizona

Ravi Sethi (born 1947) is an Indian computer scientist retired from executive roles at Bell Labs and Avaya Labs. He also serves as a member of the National Science Foundation's Computer and Information Science and Engineering (CISE) Advisory Committee. He is best known as one of four authors of the classic computer science textbook Compilers: Principles, Techniques, and Tools, also known as the Dragon Book. He also authored Software Engineering: Basic Principles and Best Practices and Programming Languages: Concepts & Constructs (1989, 1996) textbooks.

Sethi was born in 1947 in Murdana, Punjab. He attended the Indian Institute of Technology, Kanpur (IITK) and went on to obtain a Ph.D. at Princeton University. He worked as an assistant professor at Penn State University, before joining Bell Labs in 1976.

While working for Bell Labs he was awarded the "Distinguished Technical Staff award", and in 1996 he was named a Fellow of the Association for Computing Machinery. Also in 1996 he was named research vice president in charge of computing and mathematical sciences and, additionally, in 1997, chief technical officer for Lucent's Communications Software Group.

In 2014, Sethi left senior executive positions at Avaya Labs and Bell Labs and returned to academia to join the department of computer science at the University of Arizona.
