= Seattle–Tacoma Box Company =

American box company

- Formerly: Seattle Box Company; Queen City Box Manufacturing Company
- Company type: Corporation
- Industry: Wood products
- Founded: October 21, 1889
- Founder: Jacob Nist
- Headquarters: Seattle (Kent), Washington, USA
- Area served: International
- Key people: Ferdinand Nist, President
- Products: Containers, boxes, crates
- Brands: PerfectioNIST
- Website: Seattle-Tacoma Box Company

Seattle–Tacoma Box Company is a pioneering Seattle company established in 1889 by Jacob Nist and his sons as "Queen City Box Manufacturing Company." For over a century, the Nist family has continuously owned, managed, and operated the company, producing wooden crates, boxes, containers, and other wood products. Renamed "Seattle Box Company" in 1905, the business purchased a second manufacturing facility in Tacoma in 1922.

The two enterprises merged efforts in 1975 as "Seattle–Tacoma Box Company," opening a new plant in Kent, Washington. Governor Booth Gardner honored the Nist family and the company on its centennial in 1989, proclaiming the pride of the citizens of Washington for the company's "contributions to the economy of the state". In addition to wooden boxes and crates, today the company produces packaging supplies, bags, strapping, pallets, fuel pellets, portable moving and storage vaults, and seafood containers.

== Queen City Box Manufacturing, 1889 to 1905 ==
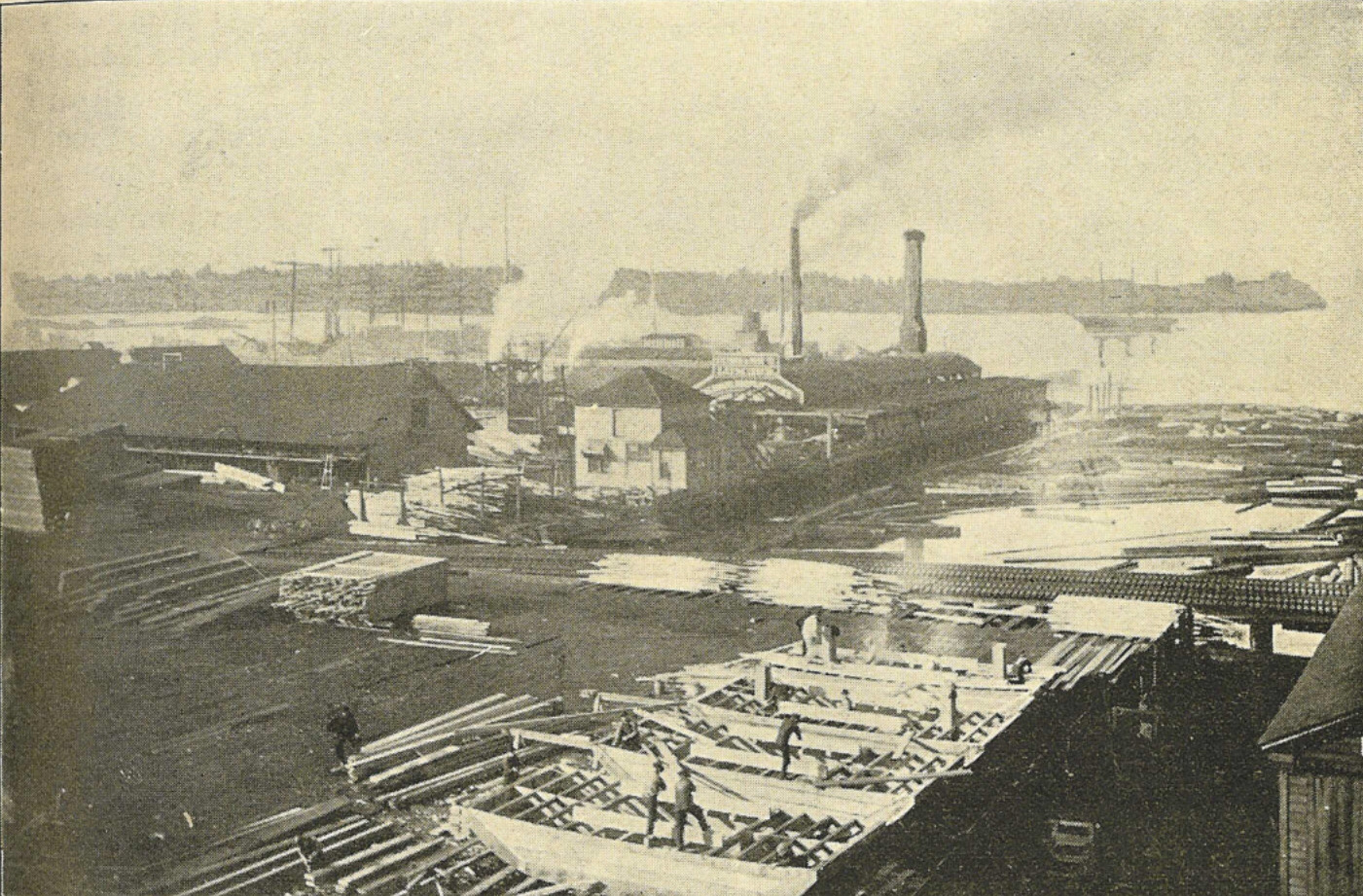
Stetson-Post Mill ca 1900

Jacob Nist, a farmer and grocer from Philadelphia, migrated to Seattle with his wife and seven children by 1880 and initially took up farming. He and his sons soon found work in the lumber mills. Nist worked for three years as a turner at the Stetson-Post Mill Company in Seattle, and his sons found employment as carpenters and mill engineers. By 1888, Nist and his sons Michael, Jacob J., George, and Aloys were all working at the Seattle Lumber and Commercial Company, which was operating 20 hours per day and had added a new box factory. That mill was destroyed on June 6, 1889, in the Great Seattle Fire, along with every other mill and wharf between Union and Jackson streets, as well as most of downtown Seattle.

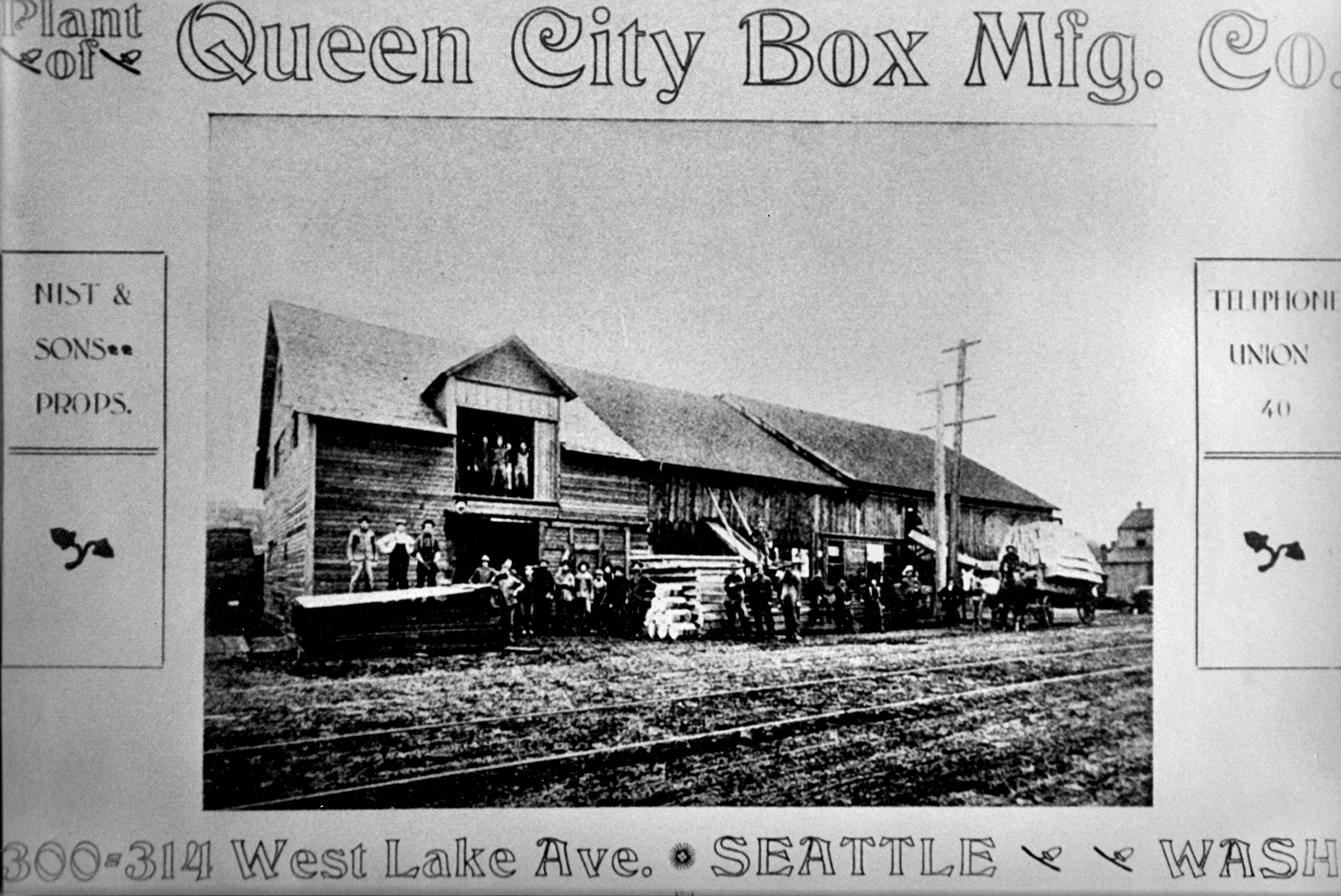
Queen City Box Manufacturing Company – postcard

To continue providing for the family after the fire, Nist and sons established the Queen City Box Manufacturing company and began production in October 1889. The original Queen City Manufacturing facility was next to the Nist family home on the shore of Lake Union. The company started slowly, and according to the Seattle City Directory three of Nist's sons, Michael, Jacob J., and John were also employed in 1890 by Skookum Manufacturing Company, another local sawmill. The company made millwork, sashes, and door frames. The Nists incorporated the company two years into production, in November 1891, with $10,000 capital, 100 shares at $100 each. The company objectives were to "manufacture, buy, sell and deal in all kinds of lumber, sashes, doors, window blinds, molding, stairs, stair rails and banisters, and all kinds of woodwork and finishing material−to operate sawmills, sash and door factories, shingle mills, box factories, and to build houses, deal in timber and own land."

Seattle experienced rapid growth in the 1890s, as did the new company, despite the temporary setback caused by the economic panic of 1893, which hit the Northwest hard. The Klondike Gold Rush began in 1897, and according to journalist J. Kingston Pierce, "Elliott Bay became the frenzied embarkation point for tens of thousands of miners shipping north." The miners provided additional business for Seattle companies that, in turn, required boxes and crates for their products. In 1903, Queen City Manufacturing Company even acquired a mine formerly owned by the Horseshoe Mining Company in Whatcom County, Washington.

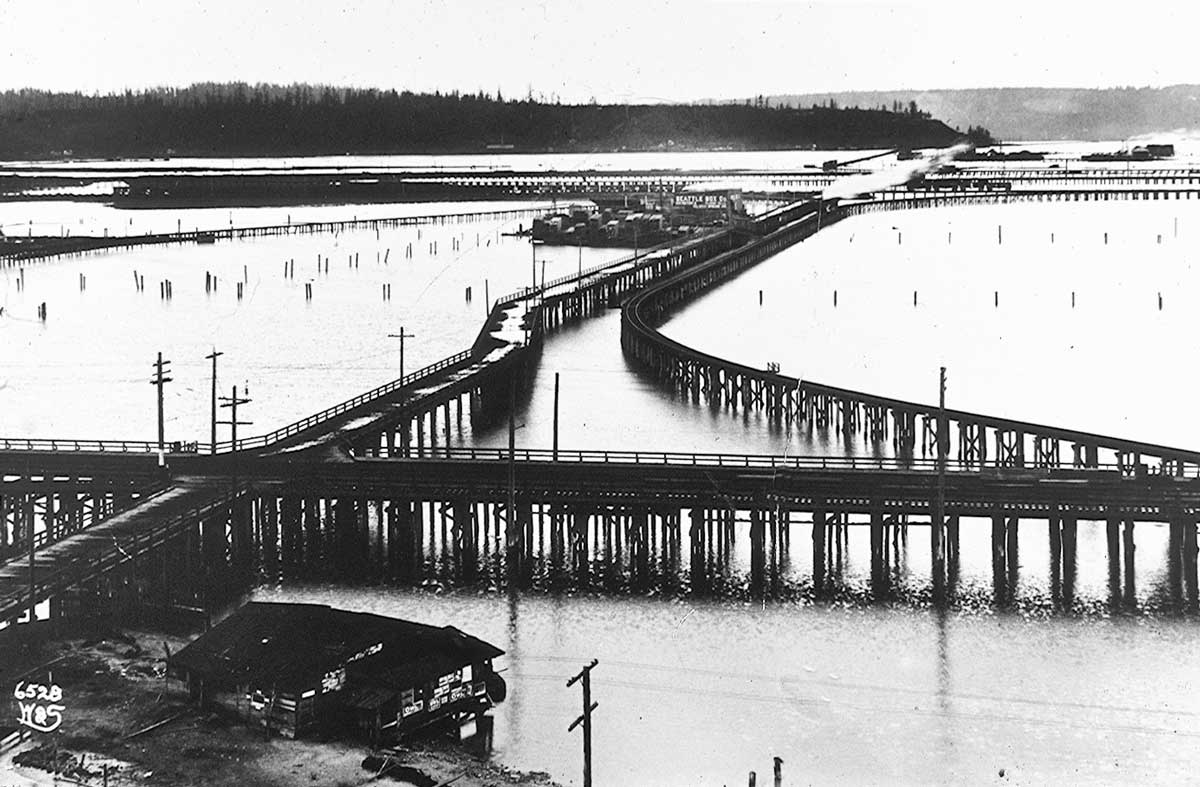
Seattle Box Company, 1905, built on Elliott Bay tidelands

== Seattle Box Company, 1905 to 1920 ==
Michael J. Nist became company president in 1905, but years before that he had become the major decision-maker of the business. Company founder Jacob Nist died in 1907, after almost six months' illness. By that time, the company had been renamed Seattle Box Company, reflecting the chief products of the company: crates, boxes, and shooks. (A shook is a set of wooden staves and headers, for assembling a barrel or cask.) The company was constructing a larger plant on the tidal flats of Elliott Bay in South Seattle. The building permit allowed three structures: a factory building, a dry kiln, and boiler room. A photograph by Seattle Times photographers Ira Webster and Nelson Stevens, circa 1905, shows the company surrounded by water, the only building in the area, accessible via a railroad trestle, a causeway built across the bay, and by a 30-foot motor launch kept under the building.

Two fires during this period, in 1908 and 1920, destroyed Seattle Box Company's mill building, machinery, and stock. The company used insurance reimbursements to re-build each time, and by 1916, assets had more than tripled, from the original $10,000 investment to over $30,000. Seattle Box Company continued production through World War I, running three shifts per day. Michael Nist stepped down as company president in 1920, selling his company shares to his sons Ferdinand and Joseph. He continued writing company checks through 1930 and died in 1932.

== Seattle Box Company and Tacoma Box Company, 1920 to 1970 ==
In 1920, Ferdinand J. Nist ("F.J.") became the third president of the company. He was a graduate of Seattle College and had learned the family business when he trained "as an ordinary workman" at the company.

=== Seattle plant expansion and Tacoma plant purchase in the 1920s ===
In 1922, the manufacturing plant in Seattle was increased in size to a three-story cutting and assembling facility. The new plant occupied an entire city block, and the company's motto was, "A good wood box for the purpose intended at a fair price." The company purchased Calef Box Company in Tacoma in 1922. Joseph Nist undertook the management of it as Tacoma Box Company while planning a new facility. Before the plant was completed, however, Joe Nist died in a drowning accident during a family picnic in 1926, at age 37. Tacoma Box Company moved into new facilities in 1928, under the management of Leo Nist.

In this decade Seattle Box began modernizing, replacing two horse-drawn delivery carts with its first truck, a chain-driven Pierce-Arrow. By the end of the decade, the truck fleet also included a Ford and three Kenworth trucks built in nearby Kirkland, Washington. Since horses were no longer needed for delivery, the old stables under the plant were converted to a dry kiln, which allowed the inventory to include a larger variety of dry lumber stock, and ended the need for a lengthy storage period to air-dry the company's large inventory, 14,000,000 board feet (33,000 m^{3}) of lumber. Other equipment modernization in the twenties included a new Stetson-Ross planer, two Mershon resaw machines, a new lumber carrier, and a new two-color modern design printer for boxes and crates.

During the twenties, the Nists also made a strategic decision to serve customers who had to order boxes in small lots, identifying a niche market. (Larger companies usually specialized in specific types of boxes, and required large orders to keep costs down.) The business that began in 1889, with four employees, had over a hundred people on the payroll by 1924, and had an extensive business in California and Hawaii. By 1927, Northwest Daily Produce News reported Seattle Box had orders from the West Indies for butter boxes made of odorless spruce, as well as another large order from a local creamery to box premium Edam cheese.

In 1928, Seattle Box Company bought a steam whistle from a Yukon River boat to mark starting and stopping times seven times daily—at five and six and seven a.m., at noon, one, four, and five o'clock. This "particularly throaty" steam whistle could be heard across a 12-mile (19 km) radius from the plant in downtown Seattle until it was finally retired in 1961, the last steam whistle in Seattle.

=== Great Depression and labor unrest in the 1930s ===
From the beginnings of the family business, the Nists owned their business property and equipment outright. The company survived the Great Depression partly because they had avoided debt, partly because they did cost studies and priced products carefully and accurately, and partly because they designed containers for individual customers rather than specializing in a limited product line.

The company dealt with recurring challenges during this decade: collections were slow and prices were reduced to maintain business; the National Recovery Administration controlled both prices and profits under the code of fair competition for lumber and timber products; there were three small fires at the Seattle plant in the thirties; and labor unrest resulted in unionizing the workforce, with a 6-week strike in 1935 as well as a week-long walkout in 1937. In spite of his previous "hands off" policy toward union organizing, Ferdinand Nist became the lead negotiator for industry in the Pacific Northwest, settling with the Sawmill and Lumber Workers of the American Federation of Labor.

Rotting timbers in an aging foundation caused a potentially serious collapse of the Seattle plant in 1935. It completely buried one man in sawdust and endangered others who were partially buried. Fortunately, all the buried men were rescued without serious injuries, and the plant was almost immediately re-built on new foundation timbers.

Eugene M. Nist (Gene) began managing the Tacoma plant in 1938. With seven employees, and only the plant supervisor and himself on the regular payroll, Gene took on the role of manager, but also "bookkeeper, buyer, labor negotiator, and troubleshooter". He scrounged for orders, eventually producing furniture frames for upholstered sofas and box springs. Even with the challenges of the 1930s, Seattle Box Company kept paying dividends on its stock during the decade. In 1938, company president Ferdinand Nist explained in a radio interview that the family company "used 12 million feet of spruce and hemlock per year, all produced within 125 miles (201 km) of Seattle."

=== World War II effort of the 1940s ===
During World War I, the company had heavy demand for boxes and crates, so early in the 1940s, Seattle Box began gearing up production, anticipating an increased need for the war effort. The company provided two and a half million boxes during World War II, for transportation of munitions, food, and supplies. The Northwest Veteran saluted the company for "the monumental part this company played in the prosecution of the nation's war program in World War II," citing the quality and reliability of its products.

Even though both plants were busy during the war, the company did not prosper in the forties due to shortages of lumber and labor as the country's workforce went to war. Minutes of the 1946 stockholders' meeting show the company's lumber inventory had been reduced, from over 3 million board feet in 1942, to just over a million in 1946. After the war, there was pent-up demand not only for boxes and crates but also for furniture that the Tacoma plant had been producing. The company expanded to produce box springs and began an effort to improve the handling of lumber to be kiln-dried. Both plants also continued to replace aging steam engines and boilers with electrical mill machinery. But there were no dividends distributed to stockholders for 1946. The trends of the decade were higher wages, shortages of materials, higher prices, and heavy competition, especially from local non-unionized factories.

=== Changing times in the 1950s ===
Company profits remained low in the early 1950s. In 1951, Seattle Box reported a loss for only the second time in sixty-two years of operation. A labor strike in 1950 and a 1954 two-month strike affected profits by raising the basic wage to $1.905 per hour.

Seattle Box and Tacoma Box sought new products and more efficient ways to produce them. Wooden boxes continued to be the main product, but paper and corrugated cardboard boxes were beginning to affect demand. The Tacoma plant set up a round conveyor system, which was then also implemented in the Seattle plant. The company adopted a new system for coloring boxes in 1957, and in 1958, began using clamp gluing and bulk shipping fasteners developed by North American Aviation. The Seattle and Tacoma plants both needed continuous foundation repairs.

The company continued its focus on specialty wood products in the 1950s, adding paneling, siding, and furniture assembly parts, as well as large crates for bulk shipping. According to Wood and Wood Products magazine, "Besides boxes, crates, delivery cases and crating lumber, the company also manufactures such apparently non-related items as bed frames, furniture stock, bread boxes, household bins, bed slats, fence pickets, bird houses, and hanging planter baskets." Manufacture of furniture stock (such as overstuffed furniture frames) accounted for 20 percent of the firm's business by 1959, with the total payroll for both plants more than 100 employees.

In the late 1950s, Ferdinand J. Nist, Sr.'s sons Emmet and Eugene assumed more responsibilities for company management. Ferdinand, Jr., left Central Washington University for night classes at the University of Washington, and also began working full-time at the Seattle plant in 1958, at age 20.

=== Revolution in the industry and PerfectioNIST brand in the 1960s ===
By the early sixties, high lumber prices and competition from new materials, such as fiberboard, paper-overlaid veneer, plastic, and metal precipitated revolutionary changes in the container and packaging industry. The Nists had competition from large producers of the new materials, as well as continuing competition from non-unionized companies with pay scales still about half that of Seattle Box.

Aging plants presented the second challenge of this period, with maintenance difficulties and less flexibility to handle new products and flow patterns. Operations were beset by pollution, noise, and smoke, in spite of new procedures for baling shavings. Leadership at the plant was also in transition, with Gene Nist as vice president at the Tacoma plant and Emmet Nist vice president in Seattle.

The firm continued developing alternative ways of using labor and raw materials. A modular panel container system was introduced in 1962, consisting of 50 plywood veneer panels that could be configured 350 different ways. "Klimp fasteners" replaced nails and cut costs by about a third, making re-use possible — and Tacoma Box had become the Northwest distributor. Moving and storage containers and a car kennel kit were also introduced in the sixties. Other new products included a unique box made originally in Japan for sujiko (salmon roe); a container developed for the Dole Food Company to transport pineapple juice concentrate; patented nailless bins for shipping cement and salt to Alaska pipeline developers; and money blanks the size of a dollar bill for the U.S. Treasury Department.

Earlier generations of the family business had allowed "Nist Bros." to be included in small print on company letterhead, with memos printed on letterhead as the primary means of advertising. But as times changed, Gene Nist developed the trademark "PerfectioNIST" for the family firm in 1968. Finally, as both plants had become outdated, the Nist family began to discuss building a new facility. A company brochure for new employees noted in 1969, "Survival is predicated on changing with the times," and listed the company's motto, "Be sure you're right...then hustle."

== Merger with new facility, 1970 to present ==
=== New facility and packaging steel pipe in the 1970s ===
The decade of the seventies brought two major changes: the Seattle and Tacoma plants were merged in a new facility in Kent, between Seattle and Tacoma; and a new method for packaging steel pipeline was developed and patented in that decade for shipping to the Alaska North Slope.

The 1970s began with generally difficult circumstances locally: in 1971, a poor salmon run affected demand for sujiko boxes; environmental concerns had repeatedly delayed opening the oil fields in Alaska, affecting orders for the larger containers with a capacity of 2 short tons (1.8 t); and Puget Sound's economy was generally poor, due to layoffs in the airline industry at Boeing. F.J. Nist retired in 1972, and Emmet Nist became president of the company.

The Nists also had to contend with two aging plants and concluded a new, modern facility was needed. Then in September 1973, a spectacular 3-alarm, 12-engine fire at the Seattle plant caused $150,000 in damages to the dry lumber storage facility. Company officers had already identified a site in Kent of 22 acres (8.9 hectares) alongside the Milwaukie-Union Pacific rail line near the I-405 freeway. Construction on the $1.5 million plant began in 1974, and by spring 1975, the merger was underway, with 75 employees joining together in the renamed Seattle-Tacoma Box Company. Both the Seattle and Tacoma properties were sold to help finance the new property. The new facility provided workspace of 120,000 square feet (11,000 m^{2}) under one roof, improving workflow; additionally, the property was large enough to provide a storage site for new clients in the oil pipe industry. Seattle-Tacoma Box Company had been providing nailless containers for shipping supplies to the North Slope oil fields in Alaska, and that ongoing relationship led to the development of new tubular packaging systems patented in 1978 and 1980. The oil pipe packaging developed by Ferdinand Nist, Jr., brought international sales.

=== Investments in subsidiary plants, 1980s and 1990s ===
By 1980, the company bought a one-third interest in a corrugated cardboard plant, the Menasha Corporation of Tacoma, and renamed the plant Commencement Bay Corrugated. In order to compete with corporate giants like Weyerhauser and Georgia Pacific, the company expanded its sales force several times. In 1985, the company's subsidiary SeaPro systems began manufacturing paper, corrugated, and wood products for foodservice industries.

In 1989, Washington Governor Booth Gardner honored the Nists and their company with a proclamation declaring October 23, 1989, Nist Family Day, for their contributions to the state's economy.

=== Twenty-first century ===
Seattle-Tacoma Box Company is based in Kent, Washington, with operations in Alaska, California, Hawaii, and Oregon. It serves agricultural, industrial, and seafood markets with packaging supplies, boxes, wood containers, bags, strapping, pallets, fuel pellets, portable moving and storage vaults, as well as seafood containers.

Its subsidiaries, SeaCa Packaging (founded in 1991) and SeaCa Plastic Packaging (founded in 2014), are in operation in central California, New Hampshire, and Arizona. SeaCa Plastic Packaging in Fowler, California, manufactures polypropylene corrugated cartons as a sustainable packaging replacement to wax corrugated. In 2019, the company built a new manufacturing location in Surprise, Arizona, with plans to create better packaging on a larger scale. Ferd Nist, Jr., president of the company, is a fourth-generation Nist, and fifth and sixth generation Nists (Michael, Robert, Jacob, Joseph, and Erika) already work in the family company.
