= CUPL =

CUPL may refer to:

- China University of Political Science and Law, a public university in Beijing, China
- Cornell University Programming Language, a procedural computer programming language in the late 1960s
- Compiler for Universal Programmable Logic, Programmable Array Logic (a proprietary language from Logical Devices, Inc.)
