= CORC =

Programming language

CORC (the Cornell computing language) was a simple computer language developed at Cornell University in 1962 to serve lay users, namely for students to use to solve math problems. Its developers, industrial engineering professors Richard W. Conway and William L. Maxwell, sought to create a language which could both expose mathematics and engineering students to computing and remove the burden of mechanical problem-solving from their professors.

CORC was designed with ease of use in mind. It contained strains of both FORTRAN and ALGOL but was much simpler. Since programs were tediously input with punched cards, the compiler had a high tolerance for error, attempting to bypass or even correct problem sections of code. Students could submit a program by 5 PM which would be compiled or run overnight, with results available the next morning.

It was initially run on the Burroughs 220 and later extended to the CDC 1604. In 1966 it was superseded by CUPL, a batch compiler for teaching which ran on the IBM System/360.

An extension of CORC, the Cornell List Processor (CLP), was a list processing language used for simulation.
