= Conway–Maxwell–binomial distribution =

Discrete probability distribution

Conway–Maxwell–binomial
- Parameters: $n\in\{1,2,\ldots\},$ $0\leq p\leq1,$ $-\infty<\nu<\infty$
- Support: $x \in \{0,1,2,\dots,n\}$
- PMF: $\frac{1}{C_{n,p,\nu}}\binom{n}{x}^\nu p^j(1-p)^{n-x}$
- CDF: $\sum_{i=0}^x \Pr(X = i)$
- Mean: Not listed
- Median: No closed form
- Mode: See text
- Variance: Not listed
- Skewness: Not listed
- Excess kurtosis: Not listed
- Entropy: Not listed
- MGF: See text
- CF: See text

In probability theory and statistics, the Conway–Maxwell–binomial (CMB) distribution is a three parameter discrete probability distribution that generalises the binomial distribution in an analogous manner to the way that the Conway–Maxwell–Poisson distribution generalises the Poisson distribution. The CMB distribution can be used to model both positive and negative association among the Bernoulli summands,.

The distribution was introduced by Shumeli et al. (2005), and the name Conway–Maxwell–binomial distribution was introduced independently by Kadane (2016) and Daly and Gaunt (2016).

== Probability mass function ==
The Conway–Maxwell–binomial (CMB) distribution has probability mass function

$$\Pr(Y=j)=\frac{1}{C_{n,p,\nu}}\binom{n}{j}^\nu p^j(1-p)^{n-j}\,,\qquad j\in\{0,1,\ldots,n\},$$

where $n\in\mathbb{N}=\{1,2,\ldots\}$, $0\leq p\leq1$ and $-\infty<\nu<\infty$. The normalizing constant $C_{n,p,\nu}$ is defined by

$$C_{n,p,\nu}=\sum_{i=0}^n\binom{n}{i}^\nu p^i(1-p)^{n-i}.$$

If a random variable $Y$ has the above mass function, then we write $Y\sim\operatorname{CMB}(n,p,\nu)$.

The case $\nu=1$ is the usual binomial distribution $Y\sim\operatorname{Bin}(n,p)$.

== Relation to Conway–Maxwell–Poisson distribution ==
The following relationship between Conway–Maxwell–Poisson (CMP) and CMB random variables generalises a well-known result concerning Poisson and binomial random variables. If $X_1\sim \operatorname{CMP}(\lambda_1,\nu)$ and $X_2\sim \operatorname{CMP}(\lambda_2,\nu)$ are independent, then $X_1\,|\,X_1+X_2=n\sim\operatorname{CMB}(n,\lambda_1/(\lambda_1+\lambda_2),\nu)$.

== Sum of possibly associated Bernoulli random variables ==
The random variable $Y\sim\operatorname{CMB}(n,p,\nu)$ may be written as a sum of exchangeable Bernoulli random variables $Z_1,\ldots,Z_n$ satisfying

$$\Pr(Z_1=z_1,\ldots,Z_n=z_n)=\frac{1}{C_{n,p,\nu}}\binom{n}{k}^{\nu-1}p^k(1-p)^{n-k},$$

where $k=z_1+\cdots+z_n$. Note that $\operatorname{E}Z_1\not=p$ in general, unless $\nu=1$.

== Generating functions ==
Let

$$T(x,\nu)=\sum_{k=0}^n x^k\binom{n}{k}^\nu.$$

Then, the probability generating function, moment generating function and characteristic function are given, respectively, by:

$$G(t)=\frac{T(tp/(1-p),\nu)}{T(p(1-p),\nu)},$$
$$M(t)=\frac{T(\mathrm{e}^tp/(1-p),\nu)}{T(p(1-p),\nu)},$$
$$\varphi(t)=\frac{T(\mathrm{e}^{\mathrm{i}t}p/(1-p),\nu)}{T(p(1-p),\nu)}.$$

== Moments ==
For general $\nu$, there do not exist closed form expressions for the moments of the CMB distribution. Having said that, the following mathematical relationship holds:

Let $(j)_r=j(j-1)\cdots(j-r+1)$ denote the falling factorial. If $Y\sim\operatorname{CMB}(n,p,\nu)$, where $\nu>0$, then

$$\operatorname{E}[((Y)_r)^\nu]=\frac{C_{n-r,p,\nu}}{C_{n,p,\nu}}((n)_r)^\nu p^r\,,$$

for $r=1,\ldots,n-1$.

== Mode ==
Let $Y\sim\operatorname{CMB}(n,p,\nu)$ and define

$$a=\frac{n+1}{1+\left(\frac{1-p}{p}\right)^{1/\nu}}.$$

Then the mode of $Y$ is $\lfloor a\rfloor$ if $a$ is not an integer. Otherwise, the modes of $Y$ are $a$ and $a-1$.

== Stein characterisation ==
Let $Y\sim\operatorname{CMB}(n,p,\nu)$, and suppose that $f:\mathbb{Z}^+\mapsto\mathbb{R}$ is such that $\operatorname{E}|f(Y+1)|<\infty$ and $\operatorname{E}|Y^\nu f(Y)|<\infty$. Then

$$\operatorname{E}[p(n-Y)^\nu f(Y+1)-(1-p)Y^\nu f(Y)]=0.$$

== Approximation by the Conway–Maxwell–Poisson distribution ==
Fix $\lambda>0$ and $\nu>0$ and let $Y_n\sim\mathrm{CMB}(n,\lambda/n^\nu,\nu)$ Then $Y_n$ converges in distribution to the $\mathrm{CMP}(\lambda,\nu)$ distribution as $n\rightarrow\infty$. This result generalises the classical Poisson approximation of the binomial distribution.

== Conway–Maxwell–Poisson binomial distribution ==
Let $X_1,\ldots,X_n$ be Bernoulli random variables with joint distribution given by

$$\Pr(X_1=x_1,\ldots,X_n=x_n)=\frac{1}{C_n'}\binom{n}{k}^{\nu-1} \prod_{j=1}^np_j^{x_j}(1-p_j)^{1-x_j},$$

where $k=x_1+\cdots+x_n$ and the normalizing constant $C_n^\prime$ is given by

$$C_n'=\sum_{k=0}^n \binom{n}{k}^{\nu-1} \sum_{A\in F_k} \prod_{i\in A} p_i \prod_{j\in A^c}(1-p_j),$$

where

$$F_k=\left\{A\subseteq\{1,\ldots,n\}:|A|=k\right\}.$$

Let $W=X_1+\cdots+X_n$. Then $W$ has mass function

$$\Pr(W=k)=\frac{1}{C_n'}\binom{n}{k}^{\nu-1}\sum_{A\in F_k}\prod_{i\in A}p_i\prod_{j\in A^c}(1-p_j),$$

for $k=0,1,\ldots,n$. This distribution generalises the Poisson binomial distribution in a way analogous to the CMP and CMB generalisations of the Poisson and binomial distributions. Such a random variable is therefore said to follow the Conway–Maxwell–Poisson binomial (CMPB) distribution. This should not be confused with the rather unfortunate terminology Conway–Maxwell–Poisson–binomial that was used by for the CMB distribution.

The case $\nu=1$ is the usual Poisson binomial distribution and the case $p_1=\cdots=p_n=p$ is the $\operatorname{CMB}(n,p,\nu)$ distribution.
