= Richard W. Conway =

American engineer (1931–2024)

- Born: December 12, 1931; Milwaukee, Wisconsin, U.S.
- Died: March 19, 2024 (aged 92)
- Education: BME, Cornell (1954); PhD, Cornell (1958)
- Known for: Stochastic simulation; COM–Poisson distribution; The book Theory of Scheduling; Programming languages and compilers; Programming textbooks; Immersion programs
- Spouse: Edythe Davies Conway
- Awards: Member, NAE (1992); Inaugural Fellow, INFORMS (2002)
- Scientific career
- Workplaces: Cornell University; RAND Corporation
- Thesis: An Experimental Investigation of Scheduling for Single-Stage Production (1958)
- Doctoral students: William L. Maxwell; Marvin Zelkowitz

Richard Walter Conway (December 12, 1931 – March 19, 2024) was an American industrial engineer and computer scientist who was the Emerson Electric Company Professor of Manufacturing Management, Emeritus in the Johnson Graduate School of Management at Cornell University. Conway spent his entire academic career, both as a student and a professor, at Cornell and held faculty positions at Cornell in several different areas: industrial engineering, operations research, computer science, and management science. He was especially known for his work and publications in foundational questions about computer simulation methodology; in writing about production scheduling theory; in developing computer languages and language compilers, including the widely used PL/C dialect of IBM's PL/I language; in authoring or co-authoring textbooks about computer programming; and in developing simulation software for manufacturing. He was also the first director of the Office of Computing Services at Cornell.

== Early life and education ==
Conway was born on December 12, 1931, in Milwaukee, Wisconsin. He grew up in that state and attended Whitefish Bay High School in the Milwaukee County village of that name. He was awarded a John McMullen Regional Scholarship for the study of engineering.

He arrived at Cornell University as a freshman in 1949. Within the Sibley School of Mechanical Engineering, he embarked upon a five-year program of study. While an undergraduate he was an officer of the university's chapter of the Alpha Delta Phi fraternity. He participated in the Cornell University Orchestra and Concert Band. In athletics, Conway did 150 pound crew, rowing stroke in the junior varsity boat during Spring 1952, then rowing a middle position in the varsity boat during Spring 1953. He was elected to the Sphinx Head senior society. He had a very early exposure to computing via attending a noncredit seminar on the IBM Card-Programmed Electronic Calculator that was given by Robert J. Walker and J. Barkley Rosser of the Cornell mathematics department. He graduated with a Bachelor of Mechanical Engineering degree in 1954.

He married Edythe Davies on 29 August 1953, herself a Cornell graduate and later faculty member in the New York State College of Home Economics at Cornell University. They had three children, and shared a love of sailing.

Conway then went into graduate study at Cornell, focusing on industrial engineering. He became interested in operations research and digital simulation, and was encouraged to continue in simulation by economist Harry Markowitz. He received his Ph.D. degree in 1958, under the supervision of Andrew Schultz Jr.; his thesis was entitled "An Experimental Investigation of Scheduling for Single-Stage Production". It was the first Ph.D. in industrial engineering at Cornell.

== Operations research and simulation ==
By 1957, Conway had been part of the engineering faculty as an instructor. Then upon gaining his doctorate, he became an assistant professor of industrial and engineering administration.

Taking advantage of a sabbatical in 1961, Conway worked at the RAND Corporation, where he had access to an IBM 704 computer and was one of the first programmers to use the simulation language SIMSCRIPT, which Markowitz was the designer of. In 1959 and 1963, Conway wrote or co-wrote journal articles that were published in the journal Management Science regarding outstanding problems and issues with computer simulation; decades later, these were honored by the journal as "seminal papers" that established the foundational framework for the entire study of stochastic simulation.

Conway was named a full professor in 1965, in what was an unusually quick time to reach that level.

His book Theory of Scheduling, co-authored with William L. Maxwell and Louis W. Miller, was published by Addison-Wesley in 1967. The book gives a systematic presentation of the subject, looking at the different types of scheduling problems that exist. It discusses solutions that rely on deterministic solutions, probabilistic solutions, and Monte Carlo simulation, weaving together a variety of published findings in the scheduling field. The book received a very positive review in the journal Management Science and a somewhat mixed review in the journal IEEE Transactions on Computers. In the years since, Theory of Scheduling has been described as a classic work. Its translation into Russian in 1975 has been credited with helping to spur a wave of research into scheduling theory in the Soviet Union. In 2002, the Institute for Operations Research and the Management Sciences listed the book's publication as one of the great moments in operations research history over the prior fifty years.

== Computer science ==
In the Fall 1956 semester, Conway created and taught Cornell's very first course on digital computers, entitled "Computers and Data Processing Systems", using an IBM 650. The assignment had been urged by Schultz, while Conway was still in the middle of his doctoral studies. Conway continued to teach that first course for several years thereafter.

In 1965, Conway, along with Robert J. Walker and Anil Nerode of the Department of Mathematics in the College of Arts and Sciences, successfully argued for the creation of the Department of Computer Science at Cornell. The new department was shared between the Arts and Engineering schools, and was funded by a large initial grant from the Alfred P. Sloan Foundation.

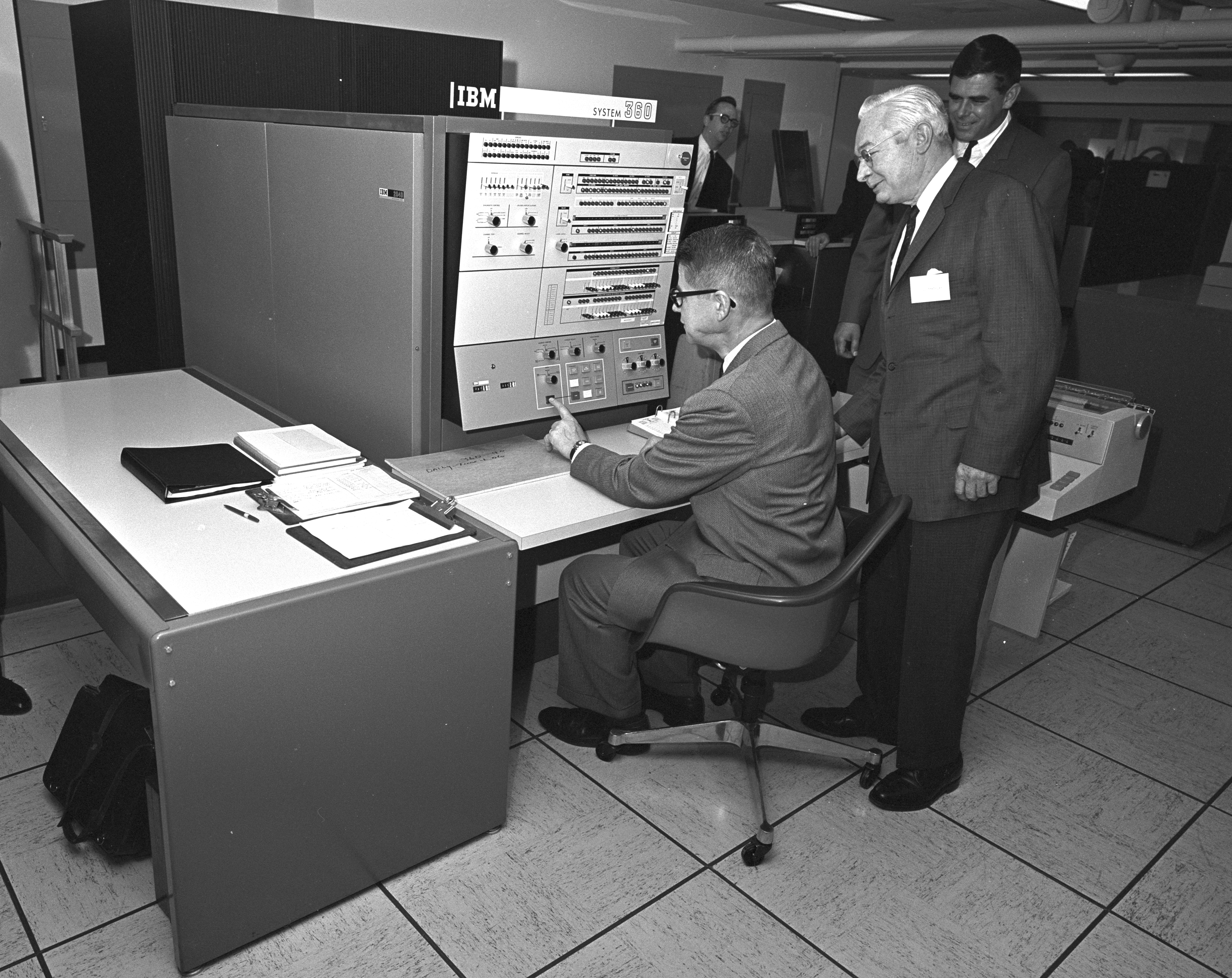
An IBM System/360 Model 40, similar to this one seen at a different site, was installed as an interim measure during Conway's time as director of the Office of Computing Services

Besides his focus on the academic aspects of computing, Conway was also involved in planning for the administrative electronic data processing capacities at Cornell. This led to him taking leave to become the first director of the campus-wide Office of Computing Services, a position he held from 1966 to 1968. The academic and data processing functions were combined in Langmuir Laboratory near Tompkins County Airport. Besides the political battles endemic to pulling multiple university entities into a coordinated plan, a major challenge came when the IBM System/360 Model 67 with TSS/360 time-sharing that the university had committed to had to be withdrawn prior to delivery due to poor performance; Conway led the effort to adapt the replacement IBM System/360 Model 65, which lacked the timesharing feature, to Cornell's need for flexible and speedy handling of batch job submissions. Conway later referred his time as head of computing services as "two really painful years" that was the least favorite part of his career.

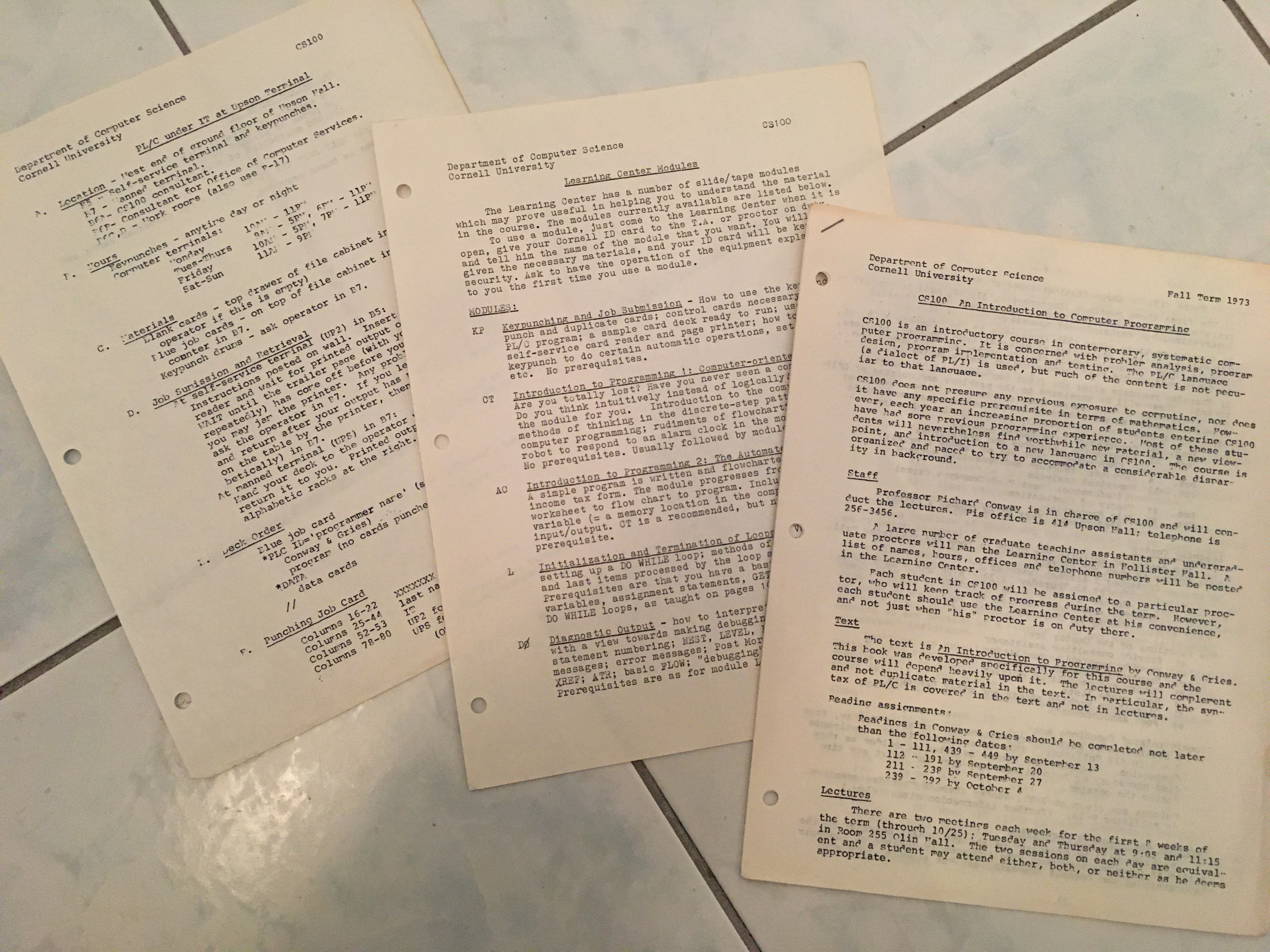
Syllabus and handouts for Conway's CS 100 course, Fall 1973, which talk about PL/C, the Conway & Gries textbook, and the keypunch machine and batch job submission procedures that motivated Conway's development of PL/C and its predecessor languages

Conway became known for developing several computer languages or dialects that included ambitious error repair via their compilers. CORC (for Cornell computing language), developed with his colleague William L. Maxwell, was a simple language intended to serve lay users, namely for students and faculty to use to solve mathematics and engineering problems. It was loosely related to both FORTRAN and ALGOL but far simpler and smaller, and due to being designed for the era of punched cards and slow job turnarounds, the CORC compiler made every attempt to bypass or correct errors in the submitted code. This was followed by CUPL (for Cornell University Programming Language), which had similar aims and incorporated various refinements, improvements, and environmental capabilities. CORC was used at Cornell from 1962 to 1966 and CUPL from 1965 to 1969.

This work on student-oriented language dialects reached its apex with PL/C, a student-oriented dialect of PL/I (with the 'C' standing for Cornell), which Conway began work on while he had a visiting professorship at the Massachusetts Institute of Technology. This kept the approach of never failing to compile a program through automatic correction errors, but this time for a much larger and more sophisticated language. PL/C became widely used in teaching programming, and eventually there were over 250 other institutions using it.

The textbook An Introduction to Programming: A Structured Approach Using PL/I and PL/C was written by Conway and his computer scientist colleague David Gries, using PL/C as the programming language, and was published in 1973. It stressed the discipline of structured programming throughout, becoming one of the most prominent textbooks to do so. It also introduced considerations of program correctness, becoming the first introductory textbook to do so. Conway later said that the book had sold very well. It led to a dozen or so textbooks modeled after it, authored or co-authored by Conway, all of which were oriented towards teaching programming but using a variety of different languages and dialects. In addition, Conway became a series editor at Winthrop Publishers around 1976.

The combination of research, writing, and teaching gave Conway a national reputation, and was part of an emphasis Cornell's department of computer science put on computer literacy in various forms. Overall, by one survey done in 1978, Cornell had the fourth-ranked computer science program in the nation. Conway was acting chair of the department at that time.

== Management science ==
However, much of the computer science department's strength was in theory-related areas; Conway was one of the very few "systems" people there. Conway gradually became dissatisfied with the theoretical direction. He stayed within the department for a while during the early 1980s, but refocused his attention on simulation for manufacturing processes. He also taught some introductory data processing courses to business students.

Then in 1984 he switched his faculty position to the Johnson Graduate School of Management, becoming a professor of information science there. He taught or co-taught courses on management information systems and information systems in manufacturing. He also resumed working with Maxwell, in a collaboration that now stretched over three decades. The main result of this work was the XCELL Factory Modelling System. This was an interactive, graphical system, that animated the process flow in a factory. It was intended to be used by people who did not have computer programming training and who were not simulation experts. The software ran on personal computers. Simulations were built by the user instantiating and connecting graphical icons representing real-world factory elements such as workstations, conveyor belts, and receiving areas. The XCELL tool was made commercially available via an Ithaca-based firm called Express Software Products, Inc. There was also an educational version. The XCELL tool achieved a fair degree of use. With additional functionality, it was renamed XCELL+ and went through several releases over the next few years.

By 1993, Conway had been named the Emerson Electric Company Professor of Manufacturing Management. At that point he became, in the words of a biographical assessment written for the journal Production and Operations Management, "one of very few people to receive a varsity letter, a PhD, and an endowed chair, all from Cornell."

After gaining funding from the National Science Foundation, Conway launched the Semester in Manufacturing in 1996. This was an immersion program in which for a full semester students took only this one course; at least half the time was spent at various corporate manufacturing sites, especially those of Corning Inc., and the other in class. Visits to labor unions were also included, as the program was coordinated with Cornell's School of Industrial and Labor Relations as well as the College of Engineering. Despite initial reluctance of the business school faculty toward the immersion idea, it was successful and became an innovative educational model within the college. In 2000, the college had four such immersive programs, and another one, dealing with e-business, was being developed under Conway's guidance. The Semester in Manufacturing immersive was subsequently renamed the Semester in Strategic Operations, and it and a number of other immersives remain a signature feature of the Johnson School into the 2020s.

Conway retired from the Cornell faculty around 1999 and became a professor emeritus. During the 2000s, he was working on a book to be titled The Practice of Scheduling, which was intended to address design, development, and use issues regarding the scheduling engines within advanced planning and scheduling (APS) tools. However the project does not seem to have reached publication.

Conway died on March 19, 2024.

== Accolades and awards ==
In addition to his academic work, over the years Conway served as a consultant for several organizations and businesses.

The History of Computing at Cornell University has stated, "Conway played a major role in the development of computing on the campus for ... 20 years or so in a variety of capacities."

The XCELL+ Factory Modeling System won an award in 1991 from Educom for using computers in the classroom in an innovative way.

In 1992, Conway was elected to the National Academy of Engineering. He was named an inaugural Fellow of the Institute for Operations Research and the Management Sciences in 2002.

Upon his death, the Conway-Walker Lecture Series within the Department of Computer Science was co-named (joining Robert J. Walker) to commemorate his contributions.

== Publications ==
Books

- "An Experimental Investigation of Scheduling for Single-stage Production", Ph.D. dissertation, Cornell University, 1958
- Theory of Scheduling (Addison-Wesley, 1967) [co-author with William L. Maxwell and Louis W. Miller]. Republished by Dover Publications in 2003.
- An Introduction to Programming: A Structured Approach Using PL/I and PL/C (Winthrop Publishers, 1973) [co-author with David Gries]
  - Second edition, 1975, with PL/C-7 used in title
  - Third edition, 1979, published by Little, Brown and Company
- A Primer on Structured Programming using PL/I, PL/C, and PL/CT (Winthrop Publishers, 1976) [co-author with David Gries]
- A Primer on PASCAL (Winthrop Publishers, 1976) [co-author with David Gries and E. C. Zimmerman]
- Introduction to Structured Programming, using PL/I and SP/k (Winthrop Publishers, 1977) [co-author with David Gries and D. B. Wortman]
- A Primer on Disciplined Programming using PL/I, PL/CS, and PL/CT (Winthrop Publishers, 1978)
- Programming for Poets: A Gentle Introduction Using PL/I (Winthrop Publishers, 1978)
  - Programming for Poets: A Gentle Introduction Using FORTRAN with WATFIV (Winthrop Publishers, 1978) [co-author with James Archer]
  - Programming for Poets: A Gentle Introduction Using BASIC (Winthrop Publishers, 1979) [co-author with James Archer]
  - Programming for Poets: A Gentle Introduction Using PASCAL (Winthrop Publishers, 1980)
- Introduction to Microprocessor Programming, Using PLZ (Winthrop Publishers, 1979) [co-author with David Gries, Michael Fay, and Charlie Bass]
- Users Guide to XCELL Factory Modeling System (The Scientific Press, 1986) [co-author with William L. Maxwell and Steven L. Worona]
  - Users Guide to XCELL+ Factory Modeling System (The Scientific Press, 1987) [co-author with William L. Maxwell, John O. McClain, and Steven L. Worona]

Selected articles

- Conway, R. W.; Johnson, B. M.; Maxwell, W. L. (December 1959). "A Queue Network Simulator for the IBM 650 and Burroughs 220". Communications of the ACM. 2 (12): 20–23. doi:10.1145/368518.368554. S2CID 22603039.
- Conway, R. W.; Johnson, B. M.; Maxwell, W. L. (1959). "Some problems of digital simulation". Management Science. 6: 92–110. doi:10.1287/mnsc.6.1.92.
- Conway, R.W. (1963). "Some Tactical Problems in Digital Simulation". Management Science. 10 (1): 47–61. doi:10.1287/mnsc.10.1.47.
- Conway, Richard W.; Maxwell, William L. (June 1963). "CORC—the Cornell computing language". Communications of the ACM. 6 (6): 317–321. doi:10.1145/366604.366651. hdl:2027/coo.31924004999086. S2CID 22654296.
- Conway, Richard W.; Wilcox, Thomas R. (March 1973). "Design and Implementation of a diagnostic compiler for PL/I". Communications of the ACM. 16 (3): 169–179. doi:10.1145/361972.361992. hdl:1813/5952. S2CID 17219041.
- Conway, Richard W. (1974). "Introductory Instruction in Programming". Proceedings of the fourth SIGCSE technical symposium on Computer science education (SIGCSE '74). Association for Computing Machinery. pp. 6–10. doi:10.1145/800183.810430.
- Conway, Richard; Maxwell, William L. (1986). "XCELL: A Cellular, Graphical Factory Modelling System". Proceedings of the 18th conference on Winter simulation (WSC '86). Association for Computing Machinery. pp. 160–163. doi:10.1145/318242.318288.
- Conway, Richard W.; McClain, John O. (May 2003). "The Conduct of an Effective Simulation Study". INFORMS Transactions on Education. 3 (3): 13–22. doi:10.1287/ited.3.3.13.

== Interviews ==
- John W. Rudan interviews Conway for the Oral and Personal Histories of Computing at Cornell, 2002
- Roger G. Sargent interviews Conway for The NC State University Libraries Computer Simulation Archive, 2011
- Roger G. Sargent interviews William L. Maxwell and Conway for The NC State University Libraries Computer Simulation Archive, 2011
- David Gries interviews Conway for the Cornell ecommons collection, 2015
