= William L. Maxwell =

American engineer (born 1934)

William Laughlin Maxwell (1 July 1934 – 31 March 2026) was an American engineer.

William L. Maxwell was born in Philadelphia on 1 July 1934, and attended Central High School. He subsequently attended Cornell University. During his studies, Maxwell met Andrew Schultz Jr. and Richard W. Conway. After Maxwell completed his bachelor's in mechanical engineering in 1957, Schultz convinced him to stay for a Ph.D., with which he graduated in 1961. Maxwell remained at Cornell as a faculty member, where he was later appointed to a named professorship in industrial engineering named after Schultz. In 1998, Maxwell was elected a member of the United States National Academy of Engineering "[f]or the theory and practice of real-time production planning and scheduling systems." That same year, he retired from Cornell and became a senior scientist at Arkieva. Maxwell died on 31 March 2026.
